= List of acquisitions by Cisco =

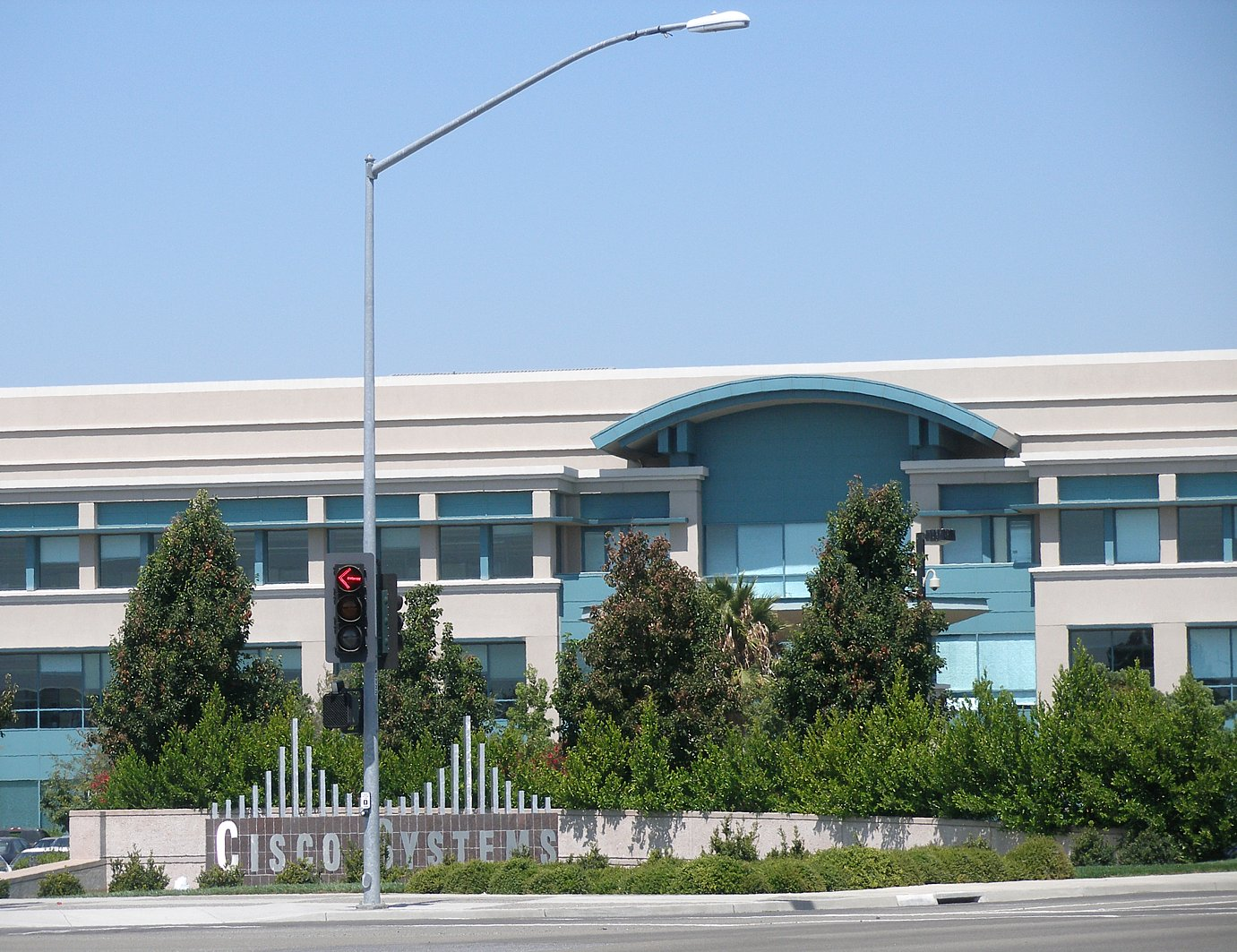
The Cisco Systems campus in San Jose

Cisco Systems, Inc., commonly known as Cisco, is an American computer networking company. Cisco made its first acquisition in 1993, which was followed by a series of further acquisitions.

Founded in 1984, Cisco did not acquire a company during the first seven years of its existence; but, on September 24, 1993, Cisco acquired Crescendo Communications, a LAN switching company. Following the first Cisco takeover purchase, acquisitions have constituted 50 percent of the company's business activity.

The company's largest acquisition as of October 2023 is the purchase of Splunk—a software company that develops software for the analysis and monitoring of machine-generated data—US$28 billion. Cisco's previous largest acquisition was tied between Cerent Corporation and Scientific Atlanta for $6.9 billion in 1999 and 2005 respectively.

The majority of companies acquired by Cisco are based in the United States (U.S.) and a total of 149 companies had been acquired as of March 2011. Most of the companies acquired by Cisco are related to computer networking, with several LAN switching and Voice over Internet Protocol (VoIP) companies included in the list of acquisitions.

== List ==
Each acquisition is for the respective company in its entirety, unless otherwise specified, and the date of the agreement between Cisco Systems and the subject of the acquisition is listed. The value of each acquisition is listed in the US$ currency because Cisco Systems is headquartered in California, U.S.

The majority of its products and business units have come from acquisitions, with Cisco Systems spending more than $70 billion to acquire approximately 218 organizations as of October 2021.

Date	Company	Business	Country	Value (USD)	Adjusted (USD)	References
September 24, 1993	Crescendo Communications	LAN switching	United States	$94,500,000	$211,000,000	
July 12, 1994	Newport Systems Solutions	Router	United States	$95,000,000	$206,000,000	
October 24, 1994	Kalpana	LAN switching	United States	$204,000,000	$443,000,000	
December 8, 1994	LightStream	ATM switching	United States	$120,000,000	$261,000,000	
August 10, 1995	Combinet	Remote office routers	United States	$114,200,000	$241,000,000	
September 6, 1995	Internet Junction	Gateway	United States	$5,500,000	$12,000,000	
October 27, 1995	Network Translation	Firewalls	United States	$30,000,000	$63,000,000	
November 6, 1995	Grand Junction Networks	LAN switching	United States	$345,000,000	$729,000,000	
January 23, 1996	TGV Software	Internet software company	United States	$115,000,000	$236,000,000	Updated on ClearOS' web page: ClearOS Pedigree
April 22, 1996	StrataCom	ATM switching	United States	$4,000,000,000	$8.211×10^{9}	
July 22, 1996	Telebit	Modems	United States	$200,000,000	$411,000,000	
August 6, 1996	Nashoba Networks	LAN switching	United States	$100,000,000	$205,000,000	
September 3, 1996	Granite Systems	Computer networking	United States	$220,000,000	$452,000,000	
October 14, 1996	Netsys Technologies	Network simulation	United States	$79,000,000	$162,000,000	
December 1996	Metaplex	Computer networking	Australia	—	—	
March 26, 1997	Telesend	Broadband Internet access	United States	—	—	
June 9, 1997	Skystone Systems	Synchronous optical networking	Canada	$89,100,000	$179,000,000	
June 24, 1997	Global Internet Software Group	Firewall	United States	$40,250,000	$81,000,000	
June 24, 1997	Ardent Communications	Broadband Internet access	United States	$156,000,000	$313,000,000	
September 2, 1997	Integrated Network	Digital subscriber line	United States	—	—	
December 22, 1997	LightSpeed International	Voice over Internet Protocol	United States	$160,000,000	$321,000,000	
February 18, 1998	WheelGroup	Computer security	United States	$124,000,000	$245,000,000	
March 10, 1998	NetSpeed	Broadband Internet access	United States	$236,000,000	$466,000,000	
March 11, 1998	Precept Software	Internet television	United States	$84,000,000	$166,000,000	
May 4, 1998	CLASS Data Systems	Computer networking	United States	$50,000,000	$99,000,000	
July 28, 1998	Summa Four	LAN switching	United States	$116,000,000	$229,000,000	
August 21, 1998	American Internet	Computer networking	United States	$56,000,000	$111,000,000	
September 15, 1998	Clarity Wireless	Wireless networking	United States	$157,000,000	$310,000,000	
October 14, 1998	Selsius Systems	Voice over Internet Protocol	United States	$145,000,000	$286,000,000	
December 2, 1998	Pipelinks	Synchronous optical networking	United States	$126,000,000	$249,000,000	
April 8, 1999	Fibex Systems	Digital loop carrier	United States	$250,000,000	$483,000,000	
April 8, 1999	Sentient Networks	Voice over Internet Protocol	United States	$195,000,000	$377,000,000	
April 13, 1999	GeoTel Communications	Voice over Internet Protocol	United States	$2,000,000,000	$3.865×10^{9}	
April 28, 1999	Amteva Technologies	Voice over Internet Protocol	United States	$170,000,000	$329,000,000	
June 17, 1999	TransMedia Communications	Gateways	United States	$407,000,000	$787,000,000	
June 29, 1999	StratumOne Communications	Synchronous optical networking	United States	$435,000,000	$841,000,000	
August 16, 1999	Calista	Private branch exchange	United States	$55,000,000	$106,000,000	
August 18, 1999	MaxComm Technologies	Voice over Internet Protocol	United States	$143,000,000	$276,000,000	
August 26, 1999	Monterey Networks	Synchronous optical networking	United States	$500,000,000	$966,000,000	
August 26, 1999	Cerent	Synchronous optical networking	United States	$6,900,000,000	$1.3335×10^{10}	
August 31, 1999	IBM Networking Hardware Division	Computer networking	United States	$2,000,000,000	$3.865×10^{9}	
September 15, 1999	COCOM A/S	Cable modems	Denmark	$65,600,000	$127,000,000	
September 22, 1999	Webline Communications	Contact management	United States	$325,000,000	$628,000,000	
October 26, 1999	Tasmania Network Systems	Web cache	United States	$25,000,000	$48,000,000	
November 9, 1999	Aironet Wireless Communications	Wireless LAN	United States	$799,000,000	$1.544×10^{9}	
November 11, 1999	V-Bits	Digital video	United States	$128,000,000	$247,000,000	
December 16, 1999	Worldwide Data Systems	Information technology consulting	United States	$25,500,000	$49,000,000	
December 17, 1999	Internet Engineering Group (IEng)	High performance routing software	United States	$25,000,000	$48,000,000	
December 20, 1999	Pirelli Optical Systems	Fiber-optic communication	Italy	$2,150,000,000	$4.155×10^{9}	
January 19, 2000	Compatible Systems	Virtual private networking	United States	$317,000,000	$593,000,000	
January 19, 2000	Altiga Networks	Virtual private networking	United States	$250,000,000	$467,000,000	
February 16, 2000	Growth Networks	Chipsets	United States	$355,000,000	$664,000,000	
March 1, 2000	Atlantech Technologies	Network management	United Kingdom	$180,000,000	$337,000,000	
March 16, 2000	JetCell	Mobile telephones	United States	$200,000,000	$374,000,000	
March 16, 2000	infoGear Technology	Information management	United States	$301,000,000	$563,000,000	
March 29, 2000	SightPath	Content delivery	United States	$800,000,000	$1.496×10^{9}	
April 11, 2000	PentaCom	LAN switching	Israel	$118,000,000	$221,000,000	
April 12, 2000	Seagull Semiconductor	Computer networking	Israel	$19,000,000	$36,000,000	
May 5, 2000	Arrowpoint Communications	LAN switching	United States	$5,700,000,000	$1.0657×10^{10}	
May 12, 2000	Qeyton Systems	Wavelength-division multiplexing	Sweden	$800,000,000	$1.496×10^{9}	
June 5, 2000	HyNEX	Internet access	Israel	$127,000,000	$237,000,000	
July 7, 2000	Netiverse	LAN switching	United States	$210,000,000	$393,000,000	
2001	AuroraNetics	Computer networking	United States	$150,000,000	$280,000,000	
July 25, 2000	Komodo Technology	Voice over Internet Protocol	United States	$175,000,000	$327,000,000	
July 27, 2000	NuSpeed Internet Systems	iSCSI	United States	$450,000,000	$841,000,000	
August 1, 2000	IPmobile	Mobile software	United States	$425,000,000	$795,000,000	
August 31, 2000	PixStream	Media player (application software)	United States	$369,000,000	$690,000,000	
September 28, 2000	IPCell Technologies	Voice over Internet Protocol	United States	$200,000,000	$374,000,000	
September 28, 2000	Vovida Networks	Voice over Internet Protocol	United States	$169,000,000	$316,000,000	
October 20, 2000	CAIS Software	Integrated development environment	United States	$170,000,000	$318,000,000	
November 10, 2000	Active Voice	Communication software	United States	$266,000,000	$497,000,000	
November 13, 2000	Radiata	Wireless networking	Australia	$295,000,000	$552,000,000	
December 14, 2000	ExiO Communications	Wireless networking	United States	$155,000,000	$290,000,000	
July 27, 2001	Allegro Systems	Virtual private networks	United States	$181,000,000	$329,000,000	
May 1, 2002	Hammerhead Networks	Computer networking	United States	$173,000,000	$310,000,000	
May 1, 2002	Navarro Networks	Computer networking	United States	$85,000,000	$152,000,000	
July 25, 2002	AYR Networks	Computer networking	United States	$113,000,000	$202,000,000	
August 20, 2002	Andiamo Systems	Data storage	United States	$2,500,000,000	$4.475×10^{9}	
October 22, 2002	Psionic Software	Intrusion detection	United States	$12,000,000	$21,000,000	
January 24, 2003	Okena	Intrusion detection	United States	$154,000,000	$270,000,000	
March 19, 2003	SignalWorks	Echo cancellation	United States	$13,500,000	$24,000,000	
March 20, 2003	Linksys	Computer networking	United States	$500,000,000	$875,000,000	
November 12, 2003	Latitude Communications	Web conferencing	United States	$80,000,000	$140,000,000	
March 12, 2004	Twingo Systems	Computer security	United States	$5,000,000	$9,000,000	
March 22, 2004	Riverhead Networks	Computer security	United States	$39,000,000	$66,000,000	
June 17, 2004	Procket Networks	Routers	United States	$89,000,000	$152,000,000	
June 29, 2004	Actona Technologies	Data storage	United States	$82,000,000	$140,000,000	
July 8, 2004	Parc Technologies	Routers	United Kingdom	$9,000,000	$15,000,000	
August 23, 2004	P-Cube	Service Delivery Platform	Israel	$200,000,000	$341,000,000	
September 9, 2004	NetSolve	Information technology	United States	$128,500,000	$219,000,000	
September 13, 2004	dynamicsoft	Communication software	United States	$55,000,000	$94,000,000	
October 21, 2004	Perfigo	Computer networking	United States	$74,000,000	$126,000,000	
November 17, 2004	Jahi Networks	Network management	United States	$16,000,000	$27,000,000	
December 9, 2004	BCN Systems	Routers	United States	$34,000,000	$58,000,000	
December 20, 2004	Protego Networks	Network security	United States	$65,000,000	$111,000,000	
January 12, 2005	Airespace	Wireless LAN	United States	$450,000,000	$742,000,000	
April 14, 2005	Topspin Communications	LAN switching	United States	$250,000,000	$412,000,000	
April 26, 2005	Sipura Technology	Voice over Internet Protocol	United States	$68,000,000	$112,000,000	
May 23, 2005	Vihana	Semiconductors	United States	$30,000,000	$49,000,000	
May 26, 2005	FineGround Networks	Network security	United States	$70,000,000	$115,000,000	
June 14, 2005	M.I. Secure Corporation	Virtual private networks	United States	$13,000,000	$21,000,000	
June 27, 2005	Netsift	Computer networking	United States	$30,000,000	$49,000,000	
July 22, 2005	KISS Technology	Entertainment technology	Denmark	$61,000,000	$101,000,000	
July 26, 2005	Sheer Networks	Service management	United States	$97,000,000	$160,000,000	
September 30, 2005	Nemo Systems	Computer networking	United States	$12,500,000	$21,000,000	
November 18, 2005	Scientific Atlanta	Digital cable	United States	$6,900,000,000	$1.1375×10^{10}	
November 29, 2005	Cybertrust	Information gathering	United States	$14,000,000	$23,000,000	
March 7, 2006	SyPixx Networks	Surveillance	United States	$51,000,000	$81,000,000	
June 8, 2006	Metreos	Voice over Internet Protocol	United States	$28,000,000	$45,000,000	
June 8, 2006	Audium	Voice over Internet Protocol	United States	$19,800,000	$32,000,000	
July 6, 2006	Meetinghouse	Computer security	United States	$43,700,000	$70,000,000	
August 21, 2006	Arroyo Video Solutions	Video on demand	United States	$92,000,000	$147,000,000	
October 10, 2006	Ashley Laurent	Gateways	United States	—	—	
October 25, 2006	Orative	Mobile software	United States	$31,000,000	$50,000,000	
November 13, 2006	Greenfield Networks	Semiconductors	United States	—	—	
December 15, 2006	Tivella	Digital signage / IPTV	United States	—	—	
January 4, 2007	IronPort	Computer security	United States	$830,000,000	$1.289×10^{9}	
February 9, 2007	Five Across	Social networking service	United States	—	—	
February 21, 2007	Reactivity	Web services	United States	$135,000,000	$210,000,000	
March 5, 2007	Utah Street Networks	Social networking service	United States	—	—	
March 13, 2007	NeoPath	Data storage	United States	—	—	
March 15, 2007	WebEx	Web conferencing	United States	$3,200,000,000	$4.969×10^{9}	
March 28, 2007	SpansLogic	Computer networking	United States	—	—	
May 21, 2007	BroadWare Technologies	Surveillance	United States	—	—	
September 18, 2007	Cognio	Mobile software	United States	—	—	
September 27, 2007	Latigent	Business performance management	United States	—	—	
October 23, 2007	Navini Networks	WiMAX	United States	$330,000,000	$512,000,000	
November 1, 2007	Securent	Digital rights management	United States	$100,000,000	$155,000,000	
April 8, 2008	Nuova Systems, Inc.	Computer networking	United States	$678,000,000	$1.014×10^{9}	
June 10, 2008	DiviTech A/S	Digital service management	Denmark	—	—	
July 23, 2008	Pure Networks, Inc.	Computer software	United States	$120,000,000	$179,000,000	
August 27, 2008	PostPath	Email	United States	$215,000,000	$322,000,000	
September 19, 2008	Jabber, Inc.	Presence	United States	—	—	
January 27, 2009	Richards-Zeta Building Intelligence	Building management systems	United States	—	—	
March 19, 2009	Pure Digital Technologies	Digital video	United States	$590,000,000	$885,000,000	
May 1, 2009	Tidal Software	Job scheduling	United States	$105,000,000	$158,000,000	
October 27, 2009	ScanSafe	SaaS Web Security Provider	United Kingdom	$183,000,000	$275,000,000	
November 2, 2009	Set-top box business of DVN	Cable	China	—	—	
December 18, 2009	Starent Networks	System Architecture Evolution	United States	$2,900,000,000	$4.352×10^{9}	
April 18, 2010	Tandberg	Videoconferencing	Norway	$3,300,000,000	$4.872×10^{9}	
May 18, 2010	MOTO Development Group	Product design	United States	—	—	
May 20, 2010	CoreOptics	Digital signal processing	United States	—	—	
August 26, 2010	ExtendMedia	Video	United States	—	—	
September 2, 2010	Arch Rock Corporation	Smart Grid	United States	—	—	
December 1, 2010	LineSider Technologies	Network Management Software	United States	—	—	
January 26, 2011	Pari Networks	Network Configuration and Change Management (NCCM)	United States	—	—	
February 4, 2011	Inlet Technologies	Adaptive Bit Rate (ABR) digital media processing platforms	United States	$95,000,000	$136,000,000	
March 29, 2011	newScale Inc.	[Cisco Intelligent Automation for Cloud]	United States	—	—	
August 21, 2011	AXIOSS Software and Talent	IT Service Management Software	Finland	$31,000,000	$44,000,000	
August 29, 2011	Versly	Integrated Software	United States	—	—	
October 20, 2011	BNI Video	Video	United States	$99,000,000	$142,000,000	
March 15, 2012	NDS Group	Conditional Access	United Kingdom	$5,000,000,000	$7.012×10^{9}	
March 19, 2012	Lightwire	Silicon Photonics	United States	$271,000,000	$380,000,000	
July 16, 2012	Virtuata	Software Security	United States	—	—	
November 15, 2012	Cloupia	Cloud Services	United States	$125,000,000	$175,000,000	
November 19, 2012	Meraki	Wired and Wireless Cloud Networking	United States	$1,200,000,000	$1.683×10^{9}	
November 29, 2012	Cariden	Network planning, design and traffic management solutions for telecommunications service providers	United States	$141,000,000	$198,000,000	
January 23, 2013	Intucell	Mobile Software	Israel	$475,000,000	$657,000,000	
January 29, 2013	Cognitive Security	Cyber Threat Protection	Czech Republic	—	—	
March 25, 2013	SolveDirect	Cloud services	Austria	$21,194,000	$29,000,000	
April 3, 2013	Ubiquisys	Mobile software	United Kingdom	$310,000,000	$428,000,000	
May 29, 2013	JouleX	Energy Management	United States	$107,000,000	$148,000,000	
July 30, 2013	Composite Software	Data Virtualization	United States	$180,000,000	$249,000,000	
July 23, 2013	Sourcefire	Computer Security	United States	$2,700,000,000	$3.732×10^{9}	
August 30, 2013	BroadHop	Leading provider of next generation policy control and service management for carrier networks worldwide.	United States			
September 10, 2013	Whiptail	Scalable solid state memory system provider	United States	$415,000,000	$574,000,000	
December 10, 2013	Insieme	Application-centric data center infrastructure	United States	—	—	
December 17, 2013	Collaborate.com	Mobile collaboration and cloud computing	United States	—	—	
February 2014	Tetration Analytics	Data Center Analytics and Security Solution	United States	—	—	
June 16, 2014	ThreatGRID	Unified malware analysis and threat intelligence	United States	—	—	
June 27, 2014	Assemblage	Cloud collaboration software	Denmark	—	—	
July 9, 2014	Tail-f Systems	Network service orchestration solutions	Sweden	—	—	
July 27, 2014	Metacloud	Deploys and operates private clouds for global organizations with a unique OpenStack-as-a-Service model	United States	—	—	
May 29, 2015	Tropo	Provides development platform for real time communications	United States	—	—	
December 10, 2014	Neohapsis	Security Consulting	United States	—	—	
April 13, 2015	Embrane	Application-centric network services including firewalls (FW), virtual private networks (VPNs), load balancers (LB) and SSL offload engines	United States	—	—	
June 12, 2015	Piston Cloud Computing	Provides software that enables streamlined operational deployment of large scale distributed systems	United States	—	—	
June 30, 2015	OpenDNS	Cloud-delivered enterprise security service	United States	$635,000,000	$863,000,000	
July 7, 2015	MaintenanceNet	Provides a cloud-based software platform that uses data analytics and automation to manage and scale attach and renewals of recurring customer contracts.	United States	$139,000,000	$189,000,000	
October 12, 2015	Pawaa	Provides secure on-premise and cloud-based file sharing software.	India	—	—	
October 25, 2015	1 Mainstream	Offers a cloud-based video platform designed to quickly launch live and on-demand OTT video services to a variety of connected devices	United States	—	—	
November 3, 2015	ParStream	Realtime Edge Analytics Database for IoT	Germany	—	—	
November 20, 2015	Acano	Acano provides collaboration infrastructure and conferencing software	United Kingdom	$700,000,000	$951,000,000	
December 22, 2015	Lancope	Enhances Cisco's Security Everywhere strategy.	United States	$452,500,000	$615,000,000	
February 3, 2016	Jasper Technologies	Developers of an Internet of Things cloud platform	United States	$1,400,000,000	$1.878×10^{9}	
March 1, 2016	CliQr Technologies	Application defined cloud orchestration platform	United States	$260,000,000	$349,000,000	
March 2, 2016	Leaba Semiconductor	Fabless Semiconductor	Israel	$320,000,000	$429,000,000	
June 28, 2016	CloudLock	Cloud-Security Provider	United States	$293,000,000	$393,000,000	
October 17, 2016	Heroik Labs, Inc / Worklife	Meeting productivity	United States			
January 24, 2017	AppDynamics	Application Performance Management	United States	$3,700,000,000	$4.860×10^{9}	
May 1, 2017	Viptela Inc.	Software-defined WAN	United States	$610,000,000	$801,000,000	
May 11, 2017	MindMeld Inc.	Conversational Artificial Intelligence	United States	$125,000,000	$164,000,000	
July 31, 2017	Observable Networks, Inc.	Cloud-Security Provider	United States	—	—	
September 22, 2017	Springpath Inc	Hyper-converged Data Platform	United States	$320,000,000	$420,000,000	
October 19, 2017	Perspica, Inc.	Machine Learning	United States	—	—	
October 25, 2017	BroadSoft	Cloud Collaboration and Contact Center Platform	United States	$1,900,000,000	$2.496×10^{9}	
December 21, 2017	Cmpute.io (47Line Technologies)	software solution to analyze cloud-deployed workloads and consumption patterns for cost-optimization strategies	India	—	—	
February 9, 2018	Skyport Systems	Cloud managed secure edge compute server platform	United States	—	—	
May 1, 2018	Accompany	Develops a relationship intelligence platform and has built one of the richest databases of decision makers in the world	United States	—	—	
June 19, 2018	July Systems	Cloud-based mobile experience and location services	United States	—	—	
November 21, 2018	Ensoft Ltd	Software solutions for service provider networks	United Kingdom	—	—	
August 2, 2018	Duo Security	Cloud-based access security, identity management, and multi-factor authentication (MFA) services	United States	$2,350,000,000	$3.013×10^{9}	
December 18, 2018	Luxtera	Privately held semiconductor company	United States	—	—	
December 18, 2018	Singularity Networks	Network Analytics Company	United States	—	—	
June 6, 2019	Sentryo	Cybersecurity for the Industrial Internet	France	—	—	
July 9, 2019	Acacia Communications	Optical Interconnects	United States	$2,600,000,000	$3.274×10^{9}	
August 6, 2019	Voicea	Meeting transcription, voice search, and meeting highlights/action items	United States			
April 6, 2020	Fluidmesh Networks	Wireless mesh networks	Italy			
May 28, 2020	ThousandEyes	Cloud & Internet Intelligence for Enterprises and Service Providers	United States	$1,000,000,000	$1.244×10^{9}	
July 31, 2020	Modcam	Video analytics	Sweden	—	—	
September 30, 2020	BabbleLabs	Computer audio background noise reduction software	United States	—	—	
October 1, 2020	Portshift	Computer application security solutions	Israel	—	—	
November 16, 2020	Banzai Cloud	Secure cloud-native application deployment	Hungary	—	—	
February 19, 2021	IMImobile	Cloud communications software	United Kingdom	$730,000,000	$867,000,000	
May 3, 2021	Slido	Audience interaction platform	Slovakia	—	—	
June 30, 2021	Kenna Security	Risk-based Vulnerability Management	United States	—	—	
July 8, 2021	Socio Labs	Event technology platform	United States	—	—	
September 28, 2022	Syrmia Networks	Embedded System Software	Serbia	—	—	
February 24, 2023	Valtix	Cloud network security	United States	—	—	
March 29, 2023	Lightspin	Cloud security	Israel	—	—	
April 30, 2023	Smartlook	User analytics	Czech Republic	—	—	
May 31, 2023	Armorblox	AI-powered threat detection	United States	—	—	
June 21, 2023	Accedian	High Performance Service Assurance	Canada	—	—	
August 31, 2023	Oort	Identity security and management	United States	—	—	
September 21, 2023	Splunk	Data analysis platform for real-time cybersecurity, full-stack observability, and machine learning telemetry	United States	$28,000,000,000	$2.9587×10^{10}	
December 21, 2023	Isovalent	Cloud Networking and Security	United States	—	—	
August 8, 2024	DeepFactor	Cloud-native application security company	United States	—	—	
August 26, 2024	Robust Intelligence	AI Security	United States	—	—	
October 3, 2024	Deeper Insights AI Ltd	Deeper Insights helps organizations design, build, and implement AI solutions and services for enterprise use cases	United Kingdom	—	—	
December 16, 2024	SnapAttack	Threat detection and engineering platform	United States	—	—	
August 25, 2025	Aura Asset Intelligence	Cyber Asset Attack Surface Management	Canada	—	—	
November 13, 2025	NeuralFabric	AI training platform	United States	—	—	
November 14, 2025	EzDubs, Inc.	Real time AI speech translation	United States	—	—	
