= IPORT =

IPORT (or other capitalisations) may refer to:

- Individual Pitch and Outcome Result Table, in The Hardball Times
- IPORT, former division of CAIS Software
- iport software Inc, founded by Chic McSherry in 2004
- Doncaster iPort, logistics facility in Doncaster, UK
