= Navarro Networks =

ASIC component developer

Navarro Networks, Inc.
- Company type: Private
- Industry: Computer networking
- Founded: March 2000; 25 years ago in Plano, Texas, United States
- Founder: Mark Bluhm
- Defunct: May 2002; 23 years ago
- Fate: Acquired by Cisco Systems
- Number of employees: 25
- Website: navarronetworks.com at the Wayback Machine (archived January 24, 2001)

Navarro Networks, Inc., was a developer of Ethernet-based ASIC components based in Plano, Texas, in the United States. They produced a network processor for Ethernet and other applications.

Navarro Networks was founded in 2000. Their CEO was Mark Bluhm, who was formerly a vice president at Cyrix. A group of nine employees left the Cyrix division of Via on March 21, 2000 to staff the company. The employee walkout had occurred just a day after Via announced that they would be spinning off the Cyrix division as a separate company.

Cisco Systems announced their intent to acquire Navarro Networks in May 1, 2002; on the same day, Cisco also announced their bid to acquire Hammerhead Networks. The acquisition was completed in June that year, with Cisco dealing Navarro a stock swap worth $85 million. Most of the 25 employees of Navarro joined the Internet Systems Business Unit to enhance Cisco's internal ASIC capability in Ethernet switching platforms.
