= Okena =

- Industry: Computer Security
- Founded: 1999
- Founders: Todd Brennan; Allen Hillery
- Headquarters: Waltham, MA
- Number of employees: 50+
- Parent: Cisco Systems

Okena is an intrusion detection company based in Waltham, Massachusetts. It was acquired by Cisco Systems on January 24, 2003, for $154M, in an all-stock transaction.

Okena's technology is behavior-based detection and prevention, as opposed to most Intrusion Detection Systems (IDS), which are binary-pattern-based. Also, the Okena endpoint agent can block certain behaviors and attacks, an early example of Intrusion Detection and Prevention Systems (IDPS). Okena's StormWatch endpoint security software formed the basis of the Cisco Security Agent (CSA).

Okena was founded in 1999 by Todd Brennan and Allen Hillery. It was initially located in Cambridge, MA.
