= Single-channel architecture =

In computer networking, single-channel architecture (SCA) is the design of a wireless network in such a way that the wireless client sees a single point of access to the network. This design utilizes a centralized controller to decide which access point (AP) will be used to communicate with a client device. This method allows the network to maintain a higher level of control over the communication medium than does multiple-channel architecture, which allows client devices to determine which APs to communicate with.

== Principles ==
Single-channel architecture is based on a principle of "virtual cells". All APs joined to a virtual cell use the same wireless channel and identify themselves with the same basic service set identifier (BSSID, i.e. a MAC address). The APs in a cell are managed by a centralized Wireless LAN controller (WLC) that coordinates the APs such that APs/transmissions do not interfere with one another. From a client's point of view, a virtual cell appears as a single AP.

Multiple virtual cells can co-exist, with each virtual cell having its own BSSID and channel. This topology effectively simulates a multiple-channel architecture and can be used to reduce channel congestion in environments with high AP density and overlapping signal range. For example, in a classroom with two cells, clients can be directed to associate with one or the other cell, leaving more bandwidth available to the clients on each channel.

== Benefits ==
The biggest advantage of a single-channel architecture is that there is a zero handoff time for roaming clients. In multiple-channel architecture, as a client device travels around the physical location of the network, it will change which AP it is associated with. Since each AP in a multiple-channel architecture has its own BSSID, a client needs to re-authenticate itself every time it associates with a new AP. In comparison, in a single-channel architecture, since the client only sees one AP, it is up to the central controller to decide when to communicate with the client using a different AP. This means that the handoff can occur behind the scenes and is completely invisible to the client. With a zero handoff time, there is no interruption to the client, which is ideal when a client is utilizing voice or video applications and does not have bandwidth in reserve to deal with the re-authentication process.

When implemented properly, single-channel architecture eliminates most, if not all, shared-channel interference by carefully regulating which APs are transmitting and preventing APs which would interfere with each other from transmitting at the same time. By knowing the transmit power of each radio, the central controller can make a good estimation of which APs would and would not interfere with each other, and regulate them when a possible interference scenario occurs.

Another potential advantage of single-channel architecture is the reduced planning required. Since every AP will use the same channel, there is no channel planning required (except to initially decide which channel is to be used). Since the controller works to eliminate any interference, it doesn't matter where the APs are placed, as long as there is adequate signal coverage and the controller is aware of the placement and capabilities of the APs.

== Disadvantages ==
The algorithms and settings used in single-channel architecture are delicately balanced. If information regarding AP placement or capabilities is incorrectly reported to the controller, then the controller could make an incorrect determination of which APs can transmit at the same time, which could potentially increase interference rather than decrease it.

Also, since every AP transmit on the same channel, APs cannot change channel to avoid external interference. Thus, in the event of external interference, the client throughput would suffer. While the controller's settings could be changed such that all APs use a different channel, but that manual configuration would negate the reduced planning advantage of single-channel architecture.

Another point to consider is that with single-channel architecture, as with wireless communications generally, increasing AP density is not always better than having fewer APs placed further apart. Placing more than one AP in a single space, a classroom for instance, will not increase the available bandwidth for clients. This is because, when multiple devices on the same channel are in range of one another, only one of them can transmit at a time. In contrast, in multiple-channel architecture, neighboring APs can be on different channels and can therefore transmit simultaneously. While multiple virtual cells could be created to avoid congestion, this has the same disadvantages as a multiple-channel architecture in that it increases management complexity and handoff time for roaming clients is no longer zero.

== See also ==
- Multiple-channel architecture (MCA)
