= Cognio =

American company

- Type: Division
- Founded: 2000
- Fate: Acquired by Cisco Systems
- Headquarters: Germantown, Maryland
- Parent: Cisco Systems
- Website: www.cognio.com

Cognio, Inc. was an American company that developed and marketed radio frequency (RF) spectrum analysis products that find and solve channel interference problems on wireless networks and in wireless applications. Cognio’s Spectrum Expert product was designed for common frequency bands such as RFID and Wi-Fi. It was sold primarily to network engineers responsible for security for wireless networks or applications that run on wireless networks. Cognio was acquired by Cisco Systems in 2007.

== History ==
Cognio was founded in 2000 and was originally called Aryya Communications. It first announced a "cognitive link processing" technology, and was located in Waltham, Massachusetts near Boston. In March 2003 it announced $12.5 million of venture capital funding from North Bridge Venture Partners and ABS Ventures as round B. In January 2005, Thomas McPherson became chief executive officer. Cognio was headquartered in Germantown, Maryland (near Washington, DC), United States, and had an additional investments that included Avansis Ventures as a fourth round in April 2007, for a total of $30 million.

== Products ==
In June 2003, Cognio announced "intelligent spectrum management" technology, sometimes called cognitive radio. Cognio shipped its Wi-Fi management software in the spring of 2005. Cognio was granted 12 patents, and submitted 172 patent applications for its RF analysis technology.

IEEE 802.11 wireless network protocols (the standards which are marketed under the "Wi-Fi" brand) operate in an unlicensed spectrum. That is, their frequency bands are not licensed by the U.S. Federal Communications Commission (FCC) or other organizations exclusively for 802.11 traffic. Instead, the spectrum is shared with many other types of devices, such as cordless phones and Bluetooth devices. Because of its shared spectrum, an 802.11 device will shut itself out of communications if the airwaves are crowded with other radio signals.

Other spectrum management tools do not measure or analyze RF interference problems. They monitor only Layers 2 and up in the OSI model, and report that performance is slow, but are typically unable to report that slow performance is caused by interference. Network engineers could make use of scientific spectrum analyzers. But these tools, which were designed for use in laboratory settings, are often too large and heavy for use by network administrators moving throughout a building during the course of a day. Many spectrum analyzers cost tens of thousands of dollars.

Cognio sold Spectrum Expert for WiFi and Spectrum Expert for RFID. (In its product naming, Cognio omits the hyphen that officially appears in the trademark Wi-Fi.) The product consisted of a PC CardBus card that included a built-in antenna and hardware designed to rapidly analyze RF activity. Spectrum Expert for WiFi scans the radio spectrum used for IEEE 802.11b and IEEE 802.11g networks (2.4 to 2.5 GHz). It can also scan the spectrum used for IEEE 802.11a networks (4.9 GHz to 5.9 GHz). Cognio Spectrum Expert for RFID is similar, except that it scans the radio spectrum used for RFID tags (851-870 MHz and 902-960 MHz).

Spectrum Expert’s bar graphs show how much Wi-Fi channel interference a specific device is causing on a specific channel. Once they identify an interfering device, network engineers can use Spectrum Expert’s Device Locator feature, which works like a sort of RF Geiger counter, to track the signal strength and location of the device, so it can be removed, repositioned, or shielded.

Cognio sold directly, but primarily through resellers, and through partnerships. These included WildPackets, AirMagnet, and Fluke Networks.

== Cisco ==
On October 3, 2006, Cognio and Cisco Systems announced a partnership. On February 26, 2007, Cisco added a web page devoted to RF interference which featured Cognio Spectrum Expert.

In September 2007 Cisco agreed to acquire Cognio. It then rebranded the product as "Cisco Spectrum Expert".
