= Airespace =

Former American networking systems company

Airespace, Inc.
- Formerly: Black Storm Networks, Inc.
- Industry: Computer networking
- Founded: 2001; 25 years ago in San Jose, California
- Founder: Pat Calhoun; Bob Friday; Bob O'Hara; Ajay Mishra
- Defunct: March 2005
- Fate: Acquired by Cisco Systems
- Website: airespace.com at the Wayback Machine (archived 2004-04-13)

Airespace, Inc., formerly Black Storm Networks, was a networking systems company founded in 2001, manufacturing wireless access points and controllers of the former. The company developed the AP-Controller model for fast deployment and the Lightweight Access Point Protocol, the precursor to the CAPWAP protocol.

== Corporate history ==
Airespace was founded in 2001 by Pat Calhoun, Bob Friday, Bob O'Hara, and Ajay Mishra. The company was venture backed by Storm Ventures, Norwest Venture Partners, Fidelity Investments, and Battery Ventures. In 2003, it entered into an agreement to provide OEM equipment to NEC. In 2004 it signed an agreement with Alcatel and Nortel to provide equipment to the two companies on an OEM basis.

Airespace was first to market with integrated location tracking. Within a year and a half, the company grew rapidly into the market leader of enterprise Wi-Fi.

Cisco Systems acquired Airespace in 2005 for $450 million; this was one of 13 acquisitions Cisco made that year and the largest up to that point. Airespace products were merged into Cisco Aironet product line.
