= Multiple-channel architecture =

Type of wireless network design

In computer networking, multiple-channel architecture (MCA) is the design of a 802.11n wireless network with multiple non-overlapping channels, resulting in the client seeing multiple points of access to the wireless network. MCA allows wireless clients to choose which access points (APs) to communicate with for access to the network, in contrast to single-channel architecture, which gives more control to the centralized network devices such as the wireless LAN controller.

MCA is the most commonly used network architecture, as it is the most intuitive way to solve the problem of co-channel interference (although it does not eliminate the problem).

== See also ==
- Single-channel architecture (SCA)
