= NetSolve =

American network services company, 1991–2004

- Formerly: Southwest Network Services, Inc. (1991–1995)
- Type: Subsidiary
- Industry: Computer networking
- Founded: 1991
- Defunct: 2004
- Fate: Acquired by Cisco Systems
- Headquarters: Austin, Texas, United States
- Parent: Cisco Systems

NetSolve was a managed network services company based in Austin, Texas. Originally founded in 1991 as Southwest Network Services, Inc. (SNS), the company was renamed Netsolve in 1995 and refocused on IP and frame-relay network management and consultancy for mid-market businesses. Its larger clients included Cisco Systems and AT&T. Netsolve was acquired by Cisco on 9 September 2004.

== History ==
Southwest Network Services was established in late 1991 as a nationwide data communications carrier. Its network was a circuit-switched infrastructure built around DSC Communications CP4000 and CS1 digital cross-connect systems deployed across major US cities as well as smaller Texas markets. During the early 1990s SNS carried subrate (below DS0) modem and DDS traffic, later scaling up to DS0, fractional T-1 and full T1 products.

In 1994, SNS deployed a frame-relay network using Cascade Communications STDX-3000, 6000 and 9000 switches. The company also sold networking equipment, progressing from Micom and Penril multiplexers to 3Com, Wellfleet Communications and eventually Cisco hardware.

In 1995, the company was renamed Netsolve, Inc. and shifted its business model toward managed network services — operating and monitoring client IP and frame-relay infrastructure through a centralised call centre and engineering team rather than running carrier capacity directly. The legacy carrier network was sold in early 1996 to ICI Communications of Orlando, Florida, which was later acquired by MCI Communications. Netsolve's hardware resale business was wound down in 2003.

Netsolve was acquired by Cisco Systems on 9 September 2004, adding its managed services capabilities to Cisco's portfolio.
