= Webline Communications =

American software company (1996–1999)

- Type: Division
- Industry: Computer networking, Software
- Founded: 1996
- Founder: Pasha Roberts, Firdaus Bhathena
- Defunct: 1999
- Fate: Acquired by Cisco Systems
- Headquarters: Burlington, Massachusetts
- Parent: Cisco Systems
- Website: webline.com at the Wayback Machine (archived 1998-06-23)

Webline Communications was a software company based in Burlington, Massachusetts, developing web-based customer interaction and contact centre tools for businesses. Its products allowed companies to manage real-time customer engagement, email and click-to-chat interactions through a web interface. Webline was acquired by Cisco Systems on 22 September 1999 for $325 million.

== History ==
Webline Communications was founded in 1996 by Pasha Roberts and Firdaus Bhathena while both were students at the Massachusetts Institute of Technology. The founders entered the MIT $50K Entrepreneurship Competition, winning the prize which provided seed money to launch the company. Roberts subsequently put his MIT studies on hold to build the business, later returning to complete a master's degree at MIT Sloan School of Management.

The company's products addressed a growing need among businesses to manage customer service and sales interactions through web channels. Enterprise customers including Fidelity, General Motors, Oracle, Toys "R" Us and Lands' End implemented Webline's contact management platform.

At the time of its acquisition, Webline employed 120 people. Cisco acquired the company for $325 million in September 1999, integrating Webline's technology into its call centre and customer interaction software strategy.
