= Wireless LAN controller =

Network device to manage access points

A wireless LAN controller (WLC) is a network device used to manage wireless access points in a computer network. WLCs are connected to routers and allow devices from across the organization to connect to the router via access points. WLCs use the Control and Provisioning of Wireless Access Points protocol (CAPWAP) to allow network administrators or network operations center to manage light-weight access points in bulk. CAPWAP replaced the previously used Cisco-proprietary Lightweight Access Point Protocol (LWAPP). The wireless LAN controller is part of the Data Plane within the Cisco Wireless Model.

The WLAN controller automatically handles the configuration of wireless access points. It centralizes wireless network infrastructure and handles bandwidth allocation to the access points (APs). Before the use of WLCs were widespread, APs had to handle connections individually, leading to unstable data links and poor connections. The use of WLCs solves this problem.

== Characteristics of WLCs ==
=== Deployment ===
The major deployment models for WLCs are as follows:

- Centralized
- Cloud-based
- Embedded

== Benefits of WLCs ==
The benefits of using WLCs are as follows:

- WLCs allow for centralized AP deployment and management, simplifying network maintenance operations.
- WLCs add an additional layer of security to the network by providing central web authentication, firewall integration, and detection of rogue APs.
- WLCs allow clients to move between APs (a behavior termed as user roaming), allowing uninterrupted service.
