= Textlocal =

Textlocal Ltd
- Company type: Limited company
- Traded as: Textlocal
- Industry: Mobile Marketing
- Founded: (2005)
- Founder: Alastair Shortland & Darren Daws (both have since left the business)
- Headquarters: Chester & Malvern
- Number of locations: 2
- Products: Bulk SMS, SMS marketing, Messenger and Mobile marketing
- Number of employees: 54 (Jan 2020)
- Website: https://www.textlocal.com https://www.textlocal.in

Textlocal is a mobile communications company founded in 2005 with offices based in Malvern and Chester.

In 2005, Alastair Shortland and Darren Daws decided they wanted to transform the way businesses, individuals and groups communicate using mobile. Txtlocal Ltd was then formed.

Since then, with the development of their Messenger product, it has allowed over 165,000 users to communicate via SMS, MMS and Mobile Web. Its services include inbound and outbound SMS and MMS communications using a web-based control panel, SMS Gateway and MMS API, mobile web page creation, mobile forms and surveys, SMS attachments and mobile vouchers and loyalty cards.

They are members of the Chartered Institute of Marketing, Institute of Direct and Digital Marketing, Direct Marketing Association and Federation of Small Businesses.

== History ==
Textlocal Ltd was formed in September 2005 as a provider of bulk SMS for businesses. In 2011, Txtlocal Ltd rebranded to become Textlocal, with a new website and branding. In 2012, Textlocal launched a new iteration of their Messenger platform, Messenger 2.0. Created by the team of in-house developers, the new platform added a number of new features and a more streamlined interface. In 2013, they released their Attachments tool, which allowed users to attach documents to an SMS through a combination of file hosting and shortened URLs. This was the first product of its kind in the mobile messaging market. This technology enabled the development of subsequent features, including mobile forms and surveys in 2013 and vouchers, tickets and loyalty cards in 2014. In 2014, IMImobile acquired Txtlocal Ltd. In 2015, Messenger 3.0 was launched, updating the platform, and then launched Textlocal India.

== Products ==
- Send and receive SMS online
- Send and receive MMS online
- SMS API gateway
- SMS attachments
- Email to SMS
- Mobile web pages
- Mobile forms and surveys
- Mobile vouchers, tickets and loyalty cards
- Mobile app

== Recent awards ==
- 2014 GP Bullhound Northern Tech Top 50 Finalist
- 2013 Deloitte Fast 500 EMEA
- 2013 Deloitte UK Fast 50
- 2012 DMA Marketing Innovation Award
- 2012 Media Momentum Top 50 Finalist
- 2011 160 Characters - Winner of Best SMS Platform
- 2011 Effective Mobile Marketing Awards winner
- 2011 North West Digital and Media Entrepreneur of the Year (Darren Daws and Alastair Shortland)
- 2011 Winner of Chester Business Award
- 2010 Internet Business Awards - Best Telecommunications Website
