= WheelGroup =

American network security company, 1995–1998

WheelGroup Corporation
- Industry: Computer security, Computer networking
- Founded: November 1995
- Defunct: 1998
- Fate: Acquired by Cisco Systems
- Headquarters: San Antonio, Texas, United States
- Parent: Cisco Systems

WheelGroup was a computer security company based in San Antonio, Texas, founded in November 1995. The company is notable for developing NetRanger, one of the earliest commercial intrusion detection systems. WheelGroup was acquired by Cisco Systems for $124 million in 1998.

== History ==
The founders of WheelGroup originally met while working together at the US Air Force Information Warfare Center in San Antonio. Several subsequently worked at Trident Data Systems before founding WheelGroup in November 1995.

The company was among the first to specialise in commercial network security and penetration testing. Its principal product, NetRanger, was a network-based intrusion detection system designed to monitor traffic for signs of attack or misuse. After Cisco's acquisition, NetRanger was developed further and its technology was eventually incorporated into what became the Cisco Adaptive Security Appliance product line.

On 12 March 1998, Cisco Systems acquired WheelGroup for $124 million, adding network intrusion detection capabilities to its security portfolio.
