= Lightweight Access Point Protocol =

Lightweight Access Point Protocol (LWAPP) is a protocol that can control multiple Wi-Fi wireless access points at once. This can reduce the amount of time spent on configuring, monitoring and troubleshooting a large network. The system will also allow network administrators to closely analyze the network.

This system is installed in a central server that gathers data from RF devices from different brands and settings. The server can command a selected group of devices to apply given settings simultaneously.

== Standardization ==
LWAPP was proposed by Airespace, as a standard protocol to provide interoperability between any brands of access point. Airespace was purchased by Cisco Systems. Its purpose was to standardize "lightweight" access points with the Internet Engineering Task Force (IETF), but it was approved as a standard. Sponsored by Cisco Systems, it has been submitted to IETF in RFC 5412.

Although this protocol has so far not been popular beyond the Airespace/Cisco product lines, the CAPWAP standard is based on LWAPP. Support for LWAPP is also found in analysis products from AirMagnet, who has implemented a software based on this protocol to analyze Cisco wireless products.

Still considered proprietary, LWAPP systems compete with other non-standard lightweight wireless mechanisms from companies like Meru Networks and Aruba Networks.

=== LWAPP Layer 2 ===
On Layer 2, LWAPP only requires a data link connection in order to transfer frames and Layer 2 broadcasts. Even if IP connectivity is not established it will still operate at layer 2.

=== LWAPP Layer 3 and 4 ===
Layer 4 UDP 12222 (data channel) and 12223 (control channel) connectivity must be established to work with this form of the protocol. Broadcasts or DHCP option 43 can be used to prime the access-points of the network. The controller must be on the same subnet if DHCP is not configured to handle layer 3 LWAPP provisioning. Another option for directing an AP to the controller is by defining the controller on the DNS server of the network.

== See also ==
- CAPWAP - Control and provisioning of wireless access points (CAPWAP) protocol specification
