= July Systems =

American software company

- Industry: Business analysis, Software, Location-based service
- Founded: July 1, 2001; 25 years ago
- Founder: Rajesh T.S. Reddy
- Headquarters: Burlingame, California, USA
- Key people: Rajesh T.S. Reddy; (Founder); BJ Arun; (CEO)
- Website: julysystems.com

July Systems is a Burlingame, California based software provider founded in 2001. The company offers cloud-based SaaS platform, called Proximity MX, that provides location analytics and deliver contextually relevant communication to visitors in a building.

== History ==
July Systems was founded by Rajesh T.S. Reddy. The company’s initial offering, MIX (mobile internet experience), was a first-generation mobile publishing platform that offered features like cross-platform publishing and distribution. The patented software, MIX, streamed Indian Premier League matches clip-by-clip using the existing 2G bandwidth, with in-house techies-cum-sports enthusiasts adding live ball-by-ball commentary.

In December 2010, July Systems won the Mobile Excellence Awards (MEA).

In 2012, July launched a retail edition of Mi, a cloud-platform studio for marketers to create and manage rich, customizable mobile promotions. The Mi Platform Studio visual tool allowed marketers to quickly create localized and short term promotions.

On 23 July 2013, July systems was selected by AlwaysOn as one of the AlwaysOn Global 250 companies to watch.

In April 2014, July Systems appointed B.J. Arun as chief executive officer.

On June 19, 2018, Cisco Systems announced its intent to acquire July Systems. The deal was completed in August 2018 and July Systems was subsequently integrated into Cisco DNA Spaces.
