= Navini Networks =

- Industry: Telecommunications
- Founded: 2000-01-01
- Founder: Wu-Fu Chen and Guanghan Xu
- Defunct: 2007-10-23
- Fate: Acquired by Cisco
- Headquarters: Richardson, Texas, USA
- Products: Ripwave WiMAX
- Website: navini.com at the Wayback Machine (archived 2005-02-16)

Navini Networks was a company that developed an Internet access system based on WiMAX wireless communication standards. This access system was subsequently acquired by Cisco Systems in October, 2007.

== Company ==
In January 2000, Wu-Fu Chen and Guanghan Xu formed Navini Networks and developed a wireless Internet access system. The company was based in Richardson, Texas and was privately funded by several investment-funds.

In 2001 it was awarded the 'Start-Up of the Year' award by KPMG and in 2002 it won some national and regional prizes. Between the formation and early 2003 it attracted $66.5 million from private investors and employed 130 employees.

When it was sold in October 2007 for $330 million to Cisco Systems, Navini had 70 customers. A Navini customer would be an Internet service provider providing wireless Internet access, mainly in areas where there are only limited wired alternatives available (such as Docsis access via a cable-TV network or DSL via the telephone network).

== Products ==
Navini developed a WiMAX wireless internet-access infrastructure consisting of two main parts: the central headend system with the special antennas and the RipWave modems or customer premises equipment

The Navini products offered a non line-of-sight wireless access system. The popular Wi-Fi systems require an unobstructed view between the antenna of the transmitter and the receiver for a good reception of the signals: when the view is obstructed the signal strength decreases and the reach of the signal is very small. By using a technique called spot beaming, normally used in satellite communications, it was possible to use radio-signals on frequencies that would normally require an unobstructed path between the transmitter and receiver or high-power transmitters.

A Navini system consists of one management-system, one or more base-systems and the user-modems or customer premises equipment.

=== Ripwave EMS ===
At the heart of a Navini-based internet access system is the EMS or Element Management System. The EMS is a network management system and can manage one or more base-systems. The EMS is a server application to manage the base-systems and end-user equipment. The Navibi EMS is a Java based IP-network management system and could run on a Windows or SUN server platform using SNMP.

=== Base System ===
The base system is the head-end equipment to which users within the reach connect to. A base-system can be compared to a base system or GSM-mast in a cellular telephone network. The central system consisted of an indoor unit and an outdoor eight element antenna system. A single BTS could allow up to 1000 end users connected to it. An end-user could connect to different base-systems, depending on which station gave the best connection at that time, but it wasn't possible to 'hop' from one BTS to another without losing the connection: the system wasn't designed for mobile communication. The Ripwave system is based on the TD-SCDMA technology and one of the founders of the company, Dr. Xu, wrote the initial drafts for this standard.

The RipWave system was one of the first land-based systems for private use that uses spot-beaming to realise the non-line of sight connection between the CPE and the BTS. Spot-beaming is used in satellite communications to aim a signal from a satellite to a specific area and so increase the signal-strength in that area.

Originally the base-station was sold as the RipWave MX8 system but after the acquisition of the company by Cisco the base-systems were sold as Cisco BWX 8300 series until it was marked as End of Life in 2008. The MX8 was a Navini proprietary protocol. It was followed up by BWX2300 WiMAX certified systems.

=== Customer premises equipment ===
To get access to a Navini WiMAX base-system the customer uses a special radio-transceiver: the customer premises equipment or CPE.
The Navini CPEs or modems introduced since September 2007 are based on the IEEE 802.16 standard. The old modems, sold as BWX100 systems, are EOL from 18 September 2009.

A CPE consists of a modem, which is in reality a radio transceiver, and has a built-on antenna. To improve signal-quality it is possible to connect an external antenna to the modem. The Ripwave CPE uses an active antenna. Although the Ripwave technology doesn't support the active handover of a call from one base-station to another (such as in cellular networks) it does support nomadic use: a CPE isn't fixed to a specific base-station: if the provider allows it, a CPE connect to any base-station in their network or even allow connections from modems of another ISP's.

== High costs ==
Worldwide there were 70 deployments. One relative early example in Europe was the Dutch ISP Introweb who were planning to offer wireless broadband internet access in rural areas in The Netherlands. The Dutch incumbent telco KPN had announced that they wouldn't roll-out DSL in these rural areas and the cable-companies like UPC and Ziggo had stopped upgrading their cable-TV networks to offer Docsis after the dot.com collapse of 2001. To offer 'always on' broadband internet this ISP was going to deploy the Navini product range on large scale.

While the network was being built, KPN changed their plans and upgraded their entire network so they could offer DSL in the whole country (including the rural areas Introweb was targeting with the Navini systems) and the cable TV operators also continued expanding their Docsis coverage. The costs of a Navini-based connection was much higher than a DSL or Docsis connection and Introweb could not compete with DSL or Docsis on both price and speed. Introweb subsequently went bankrupt.
