= ThousandEyes =

Network intelligence company

ThousandEyes, Inc.
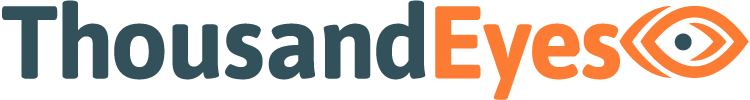
- Type: Private
- Industry: Software; SaaS
- Founded: 2010; 16 years ago Mountain View, California
- Headquarters: San Francisco, California
- Key people: Mohit Lad (CEO and co-founder); Ricardo Oliveira (CTO and co-founder)
- Website: www.thousandeyes.com

ThousandEyes, Inc. is a network intelligence company headquartered in San Francisco with offices in Dublin, London, Mexico City, Kraków, Lisbon, Sydney and Austin, Texas. The company produces software that analyzes the performance of local and wide area networks, servers and applications. On May 29, 2020, Cisco announced it would be acquiring ThousandEyes.

== History ==
The company was founded in 2010 by Mohit Lad and Ricardo Oliveira who had worked together during graduate school in the UCLA Internet Research Lab to visualize Autonomous System topologies. ThousandEyes received a $500K National Science Foundation grant in 2011 to focus on DNS infrastructure troubleshooting. In 2011, Sequoia Capital led a Series A round to invest $5.5M. The company launched their network monitoring product in June 2013. In 2014, Sutter Hill Ventures led a Series B round, joined by Sequoia Capital and Salesforce.com, to invest $20M in the company. In 2016, Tenaya Capital and GV joined a Series C round, along with previous investors, with $35M more in capital. In February 2019 the company announced it has raised $50M in a Series D round of funding led by GV (formerly Google Ventures), bringing ThousandEyes' total funding to more than $110 million. Additionally, Thomvest Ventures joined the round as a new investor alongside existing investors Salesforce Ventures, Sequoia Capital, Sutter Hill Ventures and Tenaya Capital.

Mohit Lad has stated that the name ThousandEyes derives from his co-founder's graduate school project named Cyclops, which refers to the giant creatures of Greek mythology. Lad suggested this company name in order to reflect the lineage from the Cyclops project while connoting enhancements to the original work.

== Technology ==
ThousandEyes is a software-as-a-service (SaaS) product that uses synthetic monitoring probes and real user monitoring to measure network and application performance. The product includes elements of network tomography for loss and latency, route analytics to visualize BGP advertisements, DNS monitoring, VoIP monitoring, website monitoring for HTTP and HTTPS and SNMP device polling.

== Business ==
ThousandEyes was privately held until 2020 and backed by venture investors including Sequoia Capital, Sutter Hill Ventures, Salesforce, Tenaya Capital and GV. Its customers include Twitter, Equinix, ServiceNow, EBay, DocuSign, top US banks, and many software-as-a-service cloud companies. In May 2020, Cisco announced intent to acquire ThousandEyes. In August 2020, Cisco completed the acquisition for an undisclosed amount that was reported to be near $1 Billion.

== Recognition ==
ThousandEyes has been recognized by Fortune as one of the 2019 Best Workplaces in Texas and by the San Francisco Business Times as one of the 2019 Bay Area Best Places to Work. ThousandEyes has also been recognized by Battery Ventures as one of the 50 Highest-Rated Private Cloud-Computing Companies to Work For, with data specifically provided from Glassdoor. In November 2018, ThousandEyes was recognized in Credit Suisse AG's inaugural Disruptive Technology Recognition (DTR) Program, an annual recognition of five top companies who are disrupting traditional enterprise information technology (IT Infrastructure). ThousandEyes was included in the 2014 “Gartner Cool Vendors in Application Performance Monitoring and IT Operations Analytics” report. Forbes placed ThousandEyes fourth on the list of the "Hottest Startups of 2014."
