= Starent Networks =

Defunct American computer networking equipment company

- Company type: Division
- Industry: Networking hardware
- Founded: 2000
- Defunct: 2009
- Fate: Acquired by Cisco Systems
- Successor: Cisco Systems
- Headquarters: Tewksbury, Massachusetts, United States
- Area served: Worldwide
- Products: Routers
- Parent: Cisco Systems
- Website: www.cisco.com

Starent Networks was an American information technology and computer networking products company. It was headquartered in Tewksbury, Massachusetts, USA, with major engineering facilities in Pune, India and Bangalore, India. Starent Networks was bought by Cisco in 2009.

Starent was a provider of infrastructure products that enabled mobile operators to deliver multimedia services such as video, Internet access, voice-over-IP, e-mail, mobile TV, photo sharing, and gaming to their subscribers. The products act as gateways that connect the radio access network to the IP network. The gateways allow the service provider to have fine control over the end user experience of the high bandwidth/low latency applications, transaction accounting details and access control.

On October 13, 2009, Cisco announced a plan to purchase Starent for US$2.9 billion. On December 18, 2009, Cisco completed acquisition of Starent Networks.
