= AirMagnet =

Former tech company

- Company type: Subsidiary
- Industry: Network management, Wireless security
- Fate: Acquired by Fluke Networks
- Headquarters: Sunnyvale, California, United States
- Area served: Worldwide
- Parent: Fluke Networks
- Website: www.flukenetworks.com (current) www.airmagnet.com (defunct)

AirMagnet was a Wi-Fi wireless network assurance company based in Sunnyvale, California. The firm was founded in 2001 by Dean T. Au, Chia-Chee Kuan and Miles Wu and shipped its first WLAN analyzer product in 2002. In August 2006, the company shipped the Vo-Fi Analyzer, the first voice-over-Wi-Fi analyzer that could be used on encrypted VoWLAN networks. It was backed by venture capital firms such as Intel Capital, Acer Technology Ventures and VenGlobal.

The company manufactured and sold a suite of wireless site survey tools, laptop analyzers, spectrum analyzers, handheld analyzers, network management and troubleshooting solutions (including wireless access point management via LWAPP), as well as wireless intrusion detection systems (WIDS) and wireless intrusion prevention systems (WIPS) products and VoWLAN instruments.

In August 2009, Fluke Networks acquired AirMagnet. which later became part of NetScout.

On September 14, 2018 NetScout divests Handheld network testing (HNT) tools business to a private equity firm StoneCalibre. This transaction includes AirMagnet Mobile solutions. AirMagnet Enterprise product line of WIPS monitoring solutions was retained NetScout.

August 14, 2019 StoneCalibre launched acquired HNT products as a new company NetAlly.
