= Multiven =

Blockchain services company, 2005–2025

Multiven Group BV
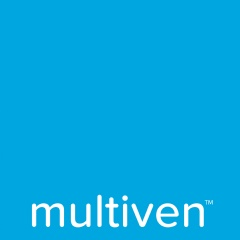
- Company type: Private
- Industry: Software Integrity Maintenance; Proactive cyber defence Blockchain-based Marketplace Service Provider
- Founded: Palo Alto, California, USA (2005)
- Founder: Peter Alfred-Adekeye
- Defunct: June 3, 2025
- Headquarters: Rotterdam, Netherlands

Multiven Group BV was a Netherlands-based provider of software integrity maintenance and cyber-defence services for Internet Protocol network hardware and blockchain nodes. It was founded in 2005 in Palo Alto, California by British-Nigerian technology entrepreneur Peter Alfred-Adekeye.

On 3 Jun 2025 the company was acquired by ProtonAI.
