= Control and Provisioning of Wireless Access Points protocol =

Networking protocol

The Control And Provisioning of Wireless Access Points (CAPWAP) protocol is a standard, interoperable networking protocol that enables a central wireless LAN controller to manage a collection of Wireless Termination Points (WTPs), more commonly known as wireless access points. The protocol specification is described in RFC 5415.

== Protocol overview ==
CAPWAP is based on Lightweight Access Point Protocol (LWAPP). The state machine of CAPWAP is similar to LWAPP's, but with the addition of a full Datagram Transport Layer Security (DTLS) tunnel establishment. The standard provides configuration management and device management, allowing for configurations and firmware to be pushed to access points (APs). Because the overall state design of the CAPWAP protocol is largely the same as the finite-state machine (FSM) in LWAPP, a detailed diagram is not needed.

The protocol uses a generic encapsulation and transport mechanism, making it independent of a specific radio technology. The specification of CAPWAP for a particular wireless technology is called a binding. An IEEE 802.11 binding is provided in RFC 5416.

CAPWAP uses UDP ports 5246 (control channel) and 5247 (data channel).

== See also ==
- Lightweight Access Point Protocol (LWAPP) used to manage a large set of WAPs
- Wireless LAN - networks consisting of one or more access points plus one or more devices
