= Webex CPaaS Solutions =

Cloud communications company

- Industry: Software
- Founded: 2000
- Headquarters: London, United Kingdom
- Key people: Jay Patel VP & GM
- Products: Webex Connect, Webex Engage, Webex Campaign, Webex Notify
- Revenue: ▲$227 million (2023)
- Parent: Cisco Systems

Webex CPaaS Solutions (previously IMImobile) was acquired by Cisco Systems in February 2021. The company provides cloud communications software and services that manage business-critical customer interactions at scale.

== History ==
In 2000, IMImobile was established. In 2010, the company acquired AIM listed WIN PLC.

IMImobile was admitted to the AIM market of the London Stock Exchange on 27 June 2014. The company has then acquired a series of small-medium businesses: Textlocal in October 2014 (UK business messaging for SMBs), Archer Digital, later rebranded to IMImobile South Africa, in September 2015 (a provider of multi-media messaging in South Africa), Infracast, later rebranded to IMImobile Intelligent Networks, in March 2017 (provider of A2P messaging to banks and telecom operators in UK & Germany), Sumotext in November 2017, Healthcare Communications in December 2017 (provider of appointment management and patient experience communications in the UK), a Canadian Business, Impact Mobile in July 2018, and in August 2019, an American B2B text-engagement and RCS front runner, 3Cinteractive.

In December 2020, Cisco Systems announced its intention to acquire IMImobile PLC in a $730M deal. The deal was completed in February 2021 and IMImobile was renamed to Webex CPaaS Solutions.
