= Hammerhead Networks =

American networking software company

- Type: Private (2000–2002)
- Industry: Computer networking
- Founded: April 2000; 26 years ago in Waltham, Massachusetts, United States
- Founder: Eddie Sullivan
- Defunct: May 1, 2002
- Fate: Acquired by Cisco Systems, 2002
- Headquarters: Billerica, Massachusetts, United States
- Products: IP service delivery software
- Number of employees: 85
- Parent: Cisco Systems (2002)
- Website: hammerheadnetworks.com at the Wayback Machine (archived 2002-01-18)

Hammerhead Networks Inc. was a computer networking software company founded in Waltham, Massachusetts in April 2000 and later based in Billerica, Massachusetts. The company developed software for the delivery of Internet Protocol (IP) service features, targeting internet service providers and network operators seeking to deploy and manage advanced IP services. Cisco Systems acquired Hammerhead Networks on 1 May 2002 in a stock transaction valued at up to US$173 million.

== History ==
Hammerhead Networks was founded in April 2000 by Eddie Sullivan, who was chief executive officer. The company focused on software enabling carriers and service providers to deliver differentiated IP services, an area of significant investment in the early 2000s as providers sought to add value to their broadband and data networks.

Cisco had previously held a minority stake in the company. On 1 May 2002, Cisco announced it would acquire both Hammerhead Networks and Navarro Networks in transactions together valued at approximately $258 million, with the Hammerhead portion worth up to $173 million in stock. Hammerhead had 85 employees at the time of the acquisition.
