= CAIS Software =

American software company

- Type: Subsidiary
- Industry: Computer networking
- Founded: Mid-1990s
- Headquarters: San Diego, California, United States
- Parent: CAIS Internet

CAIS Software was an integrated development environment company based in San Diego, California, United States. The company was formed in the mid-1990s under the name Atcom/Info. The IPORT division was acquired by Cisco Systems on October 20, 2000. The remaining assets of the company, including the CyberShell division, were sold on May 15, 2002.
