= Cisco =

American multinational technology company

Cisco Systems, Inc.

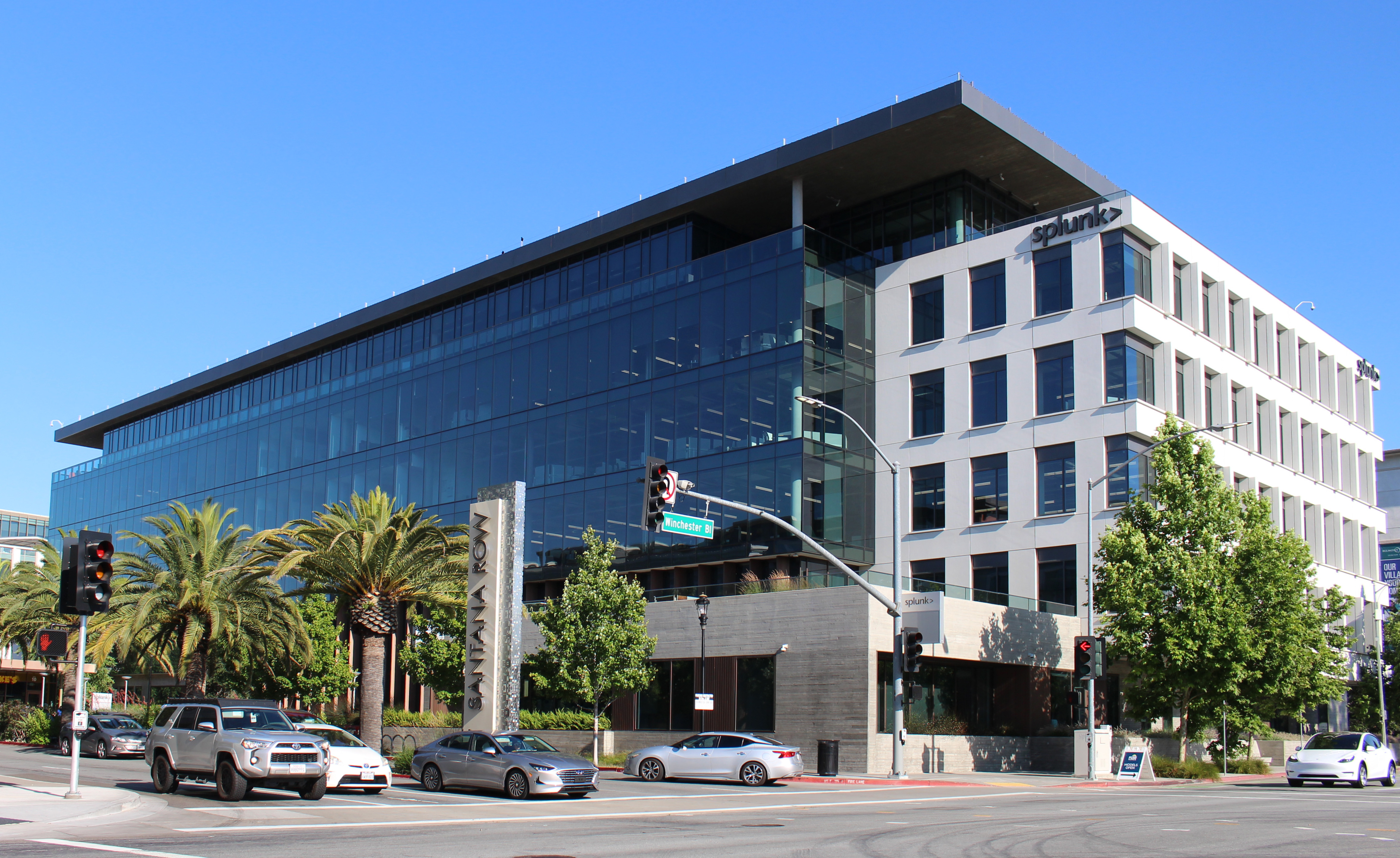
- Cisco's headquarters in Santana Row, San Jose, California
- Type: Public
- Traded as: Nasdaq: CSCO; Nasdaq-100 component; DJIA component; S&P 100 component; S&P 500 component
- ISIN: US17275R1023
- Industry: Computer networking; Telecommunications equipment; Networking hardware; Computer software; Cybersecurity; Cloud computing
- Founded: December 10, 1984; 41 years ago in San Francisco, California, U.S.
- Founders: Leonard Bosack; Sandy Lerner
- Headquarters: San Jose, California, U.S.
- Area served: Worldwide
- Key people: Chuck Robbins (CEO & chairman)
- Products: Routers; Network switches; Firewalls and security software; Webex; Cisco IOS; UCS servers; (more)
- Services: Managed services; Cloud management; IT consulting
- Revenue: ▲US$56.65 billion (2025)
- Operating income: ▼US$11.76 billion (2025)
- Net income: ▼US$10.18 billion (2025)
- Total assets: ▼US$122.3 billion (2025)
- Total equity: ▲US$46.84 billion (2025)
- Number of employees: 86,200 (2025)
- Website: cisco.com
- Footnotes; Financials as of July 26, 2025.

Cisco Systems, Inc., doing business as Cisco (/ˈsɪs.koʊ/, SISS-koh), is an American multinational technology conglomerate corporation that develops, manufactures, and sells hardware, software, telecommunications equipment, and other high-technology services and products focused on networking, cybersecurity and AI. Cisco specializes in specific tech markets, such as the Internet of things (IoT), domain security, videoconferencing, and energy management, including products such as Webex, OpenDNS, Jabber, and Jasper. The company is headquartered in San Jose, California, and, as of June 29, 2026, has a market capitalization of $461 billion.

Cisco Systems was founded in December 1984 by Leonard Bosack and Sandy Lerner, two Stanford University computer scientists. They pioneered the concept of a local area network (LAN) being used to connect distant computers over a multiprotocol router system. The company went public in 1990 and, by the end of the dot-com bubble in 2000, had a market capitalization of $500 billion, surpassing Microsoft as the world's most valuable company, prior to losing 80 percent of its value by 2002, as the market bubble burst.

Cisco stock (CSCO), trading on Nasdaq since 1990, was added to the Dow Jones Industrial Average on June 8, 2009. It is also included in the S&P 500, Nasdaq-100, and the Russell 1000 indices.

== History ==
=== 1984–1995 ===
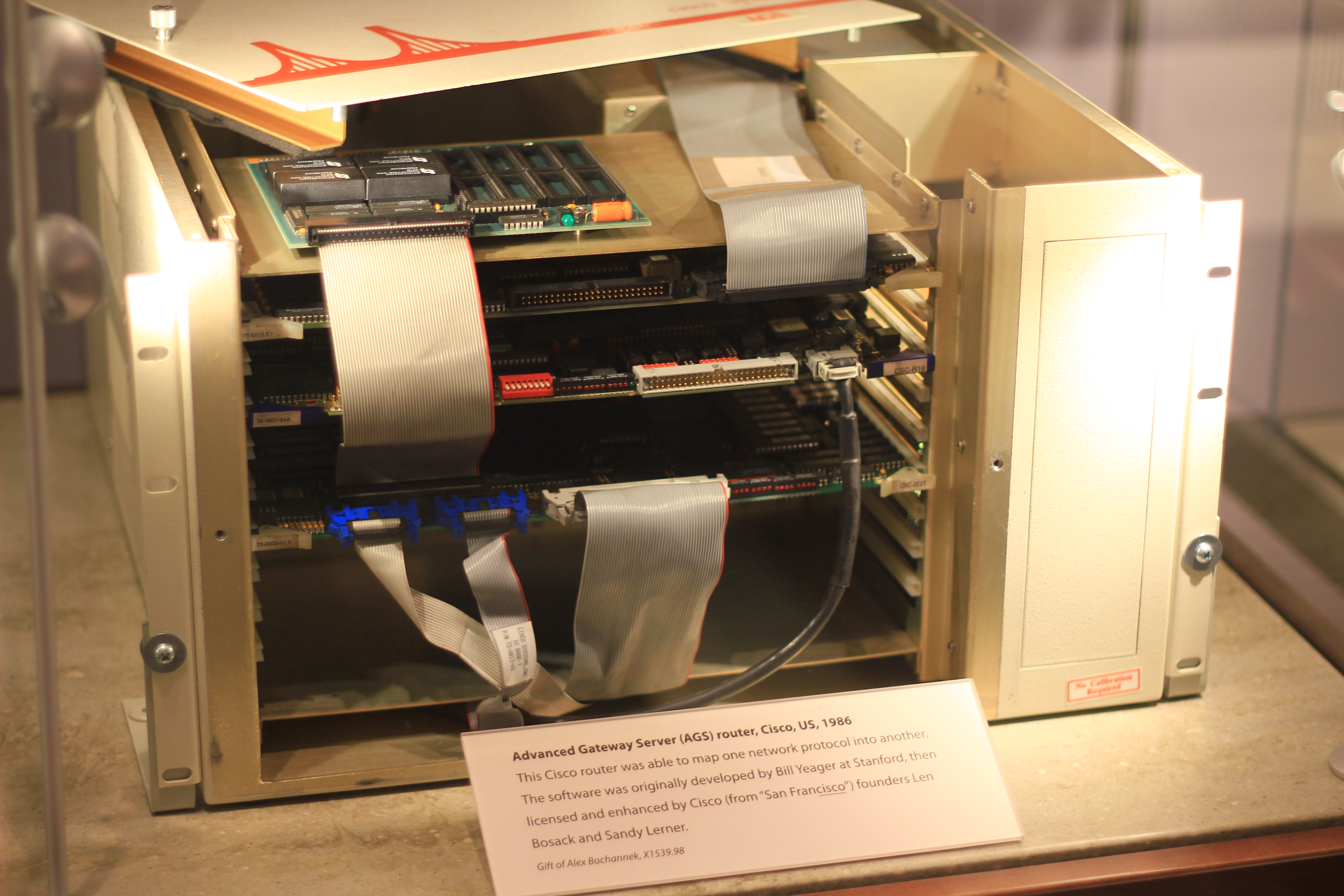
Cisco's first router, the Advanced Gateway Server (AGS) router (1986)

Cisco Systems was founded in December 1984 by Sandy Lerner, along with her husband Leonard Bosack. Lerner was the director of computer facilities for the Stanford University Graduate School of Business. Bosack was in charge of the Stanford University computer science department's computers.

Cisco's initial product has roots in Stanford University's campus technology. In the early 1980s, students and staff at Stanford, including Bosack, used technology on the campus to link all of the school's computer systems to talk to one another, creating a box that functioned as a multi-protocol router called the "Blue Box". The Blue Box used circuitry made by Andy Bechtolsheim, and software that was originally written at Stanford by research engineer William Yeager. Due to the underlying architecture, and its ability to scale well, Yeager's well-designed invention became a key to Cisco's early success.

In 1985, Bosack and Stanford employee Kirk Lougheed began a project to formally network Stanford's campus. They adapted Yeager's software into what became the foundation for Cisco IOS, despite Yeager's claims that he had been denied permission to sell the Blue Box commercially. On July 11, 1986, Bosack and Lougheed were forced to resign from Stanford and the university contemplated filing criminal complaints against Cisco and its founders for the theft of its software, hardware designs, and other intellectual properties. In 1987, Stanford licensed the router software and two computer boards to Cisco. In addition to Bosack, Lerner, Lougheed, Greg Satz (a programmer), and Richard Troiano (who handled sales), completed the early Cisco team. The company's first CEO was Bill Graves, who held the position from 1987 to 1988. In 1988, John Morgridge was appointed CEO.

The name "Cisco" was derived from the city name San Francisco, which is why the company's engineers insisted on using the lowercase "cisco" in its early years. The logo is a stylized depiction of the two towers of the Golden Gate Bridge.

On February 16, 1990, Cisco Systems went public with a market capitalization of $224 million, and was listed on the NASDAQ stock exchange. On August 28, 1990, Lerner was fired. Upon hearing the news, her husband Bosack resigned in protest.

Although Cisco was not the first company to develop and sell dedicated network nodes, it was one of the first to sell commercially successful routers supporting multiple network protocols. Classical, CPU-based architecture of early Cisco devices coupled with flexibility of operating system IOS allowed for keeping up with evolving technology needs by means of frequent software upgrades. Some popular models of that time (such as Cisco 2500) managed to stay in production for almost a decade virtually unchanged. The company was quick to capture the emerging service provider environment, entering the SP market with product lines such as Cisco 7000 and Cisco 8500.

Between 1992 and 1994, Cisco acquired several companies in Ethernet switching, such as Kalpana, Grand Junction and most notably, Mario Mazzola's Crescendo Communications, which together formed the Catalyst business unit. At the time, the company envisioned layer 3 routing and layer 2 (Ethernet, Token Ring) switching as complementary functions of different intelligence and architecture—the former was slow and complex, the latter was fast but simple. This philosophy dominated the company's product lines throughout the 1990s.

In 1995, John Morgridge was succeeded by John T. Chambers.

=== 1996–2005: Internet and silicon intelligence ===
Logo used in the 1990s and early 2000s

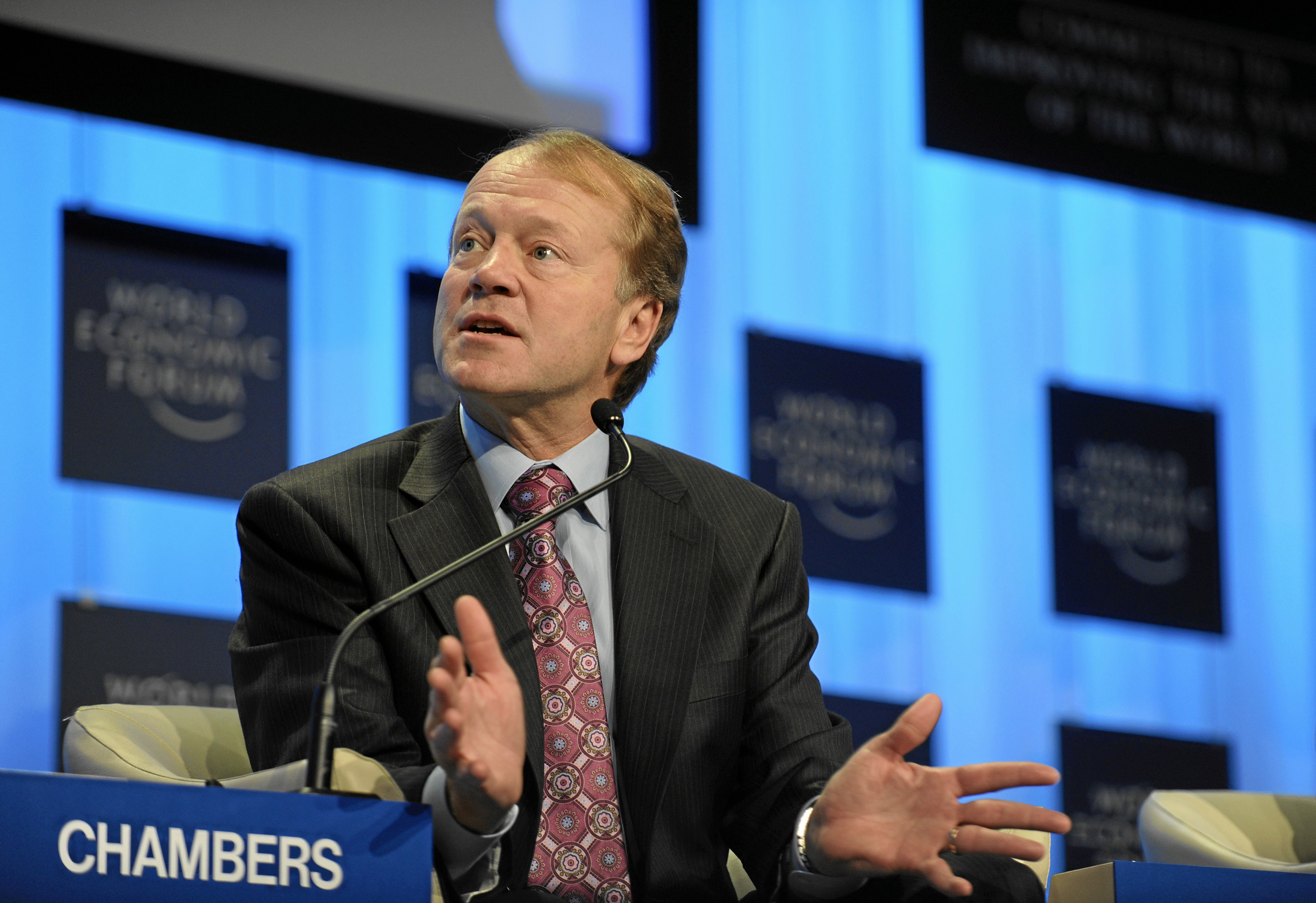
John T. Chambers in 2010, who was the CEO between 1995 and 2015

The Internet Protocol (IP) became widely adopted in the mid-to-late 1990s. Cisco introduced products ranging from modem access shelves (AS5200) to core GSR routers, making them a major player in the market. In late March 2000, at the height of the dot-com bubble, Cisco became the most valuable company in the world, with a market capitalization of more than $500 billion, before the loss of $431 billion when the bubble burst.

The perceived complexity of programming routing functions in silicon led to the formation of several startups determined to find new ways to process IP and MPLS packets entirely in hardware and blur boundaries between routing and switching. One of them, Juniper Networks, shipped its first product in 1999 and by 2000 chipped away about 30% from Cisco SP Market share. In response, Cisco later developed homegrown ASICs and fast processing cards for GSR routers and Catalyst 6500 switches. In 2004, Cisco also started the migration to new high-end hardware CRS-1 and software architecture IOS XR.

=== 2006–2012: The Human Network ===
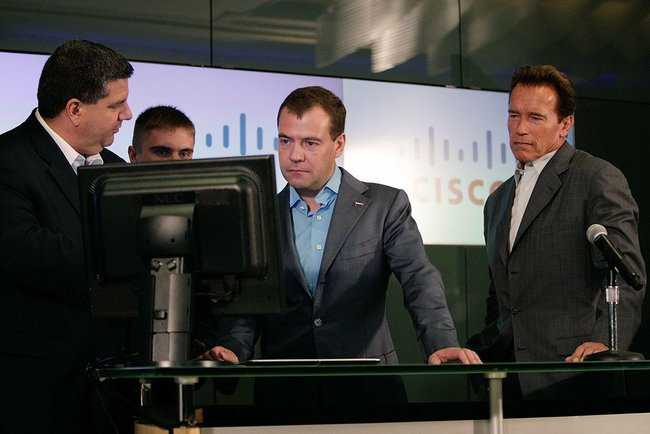
Russian President Dmitry Medvedev and California Gov. Arnold Schwarzenegger at Cisco, 2010

As part of a rebranding campaign in 2006, Cisco Systems adopted the shortened name "Cisco" and created "The Human Network" advertising campaign. These efforts were meant to make Cisco a "household" brand—a strategy designed to support the low-end Linksys products and future consumer products.

On the more traditional business side, Cisco continued to develop its routing, switching and security portfolio. The quickly growing importance of Ethernet also influenced the company's product lines. Limits of IOS and aging Crescendo architecture also forced Cisco to look at merchant silicon in the carrier Ethernet segment. This resulted in a new ASR 9000 product family intended to consolidate the company's carrier Ethernet and subscriber management business around EZChip-based hardware and IOS-XR.

In March 2007, Cisco acquired Reactivity Inc, a privately held XML gateway provider based in Redwood City, California. Cisco placed the Reactivity team and product portfolio under its Datacenter Switching and Security Technology Group, which reported to the company's then senior vice president Jayshree Ullal.

Throughout the mid-2000s, Cisco also built a significant presence in India, establishing its Globalization Centre East in Bangalore for $1 billion. Cisco also expanded into new markets by acquisition, including its 2009 purchase of mobile specialist Starent Networks for $2.9 billion.

Cisco continued to be challenged by both domestic competitors Alcatel-Lucent, Juniper Networks, and an overseas competitor Huawei. Due to lower-than-expected profit in 2011, Cisco reduced annual expenses by $1 billion. The company cut around 3,000 employees with an early-retirement program who accepted a buyout and planned to eliminate as many as 10,000 jobs (around 14 percent of the 73,400 total employees before curtailment). During the 2011 analyst call, Cisco's CEO John Chambers called out several competitors by name, including Juniper and HP.

On July 24, 2012, Cisco received approval from the EU to acquire NDS (a TV software developer) for US$5 billion. In 2013, Cisco sold its Linksys home-router unit to Belkin International Inc., signaling a shift to sales to businesses rather than consumers.

=== 2013–present ===
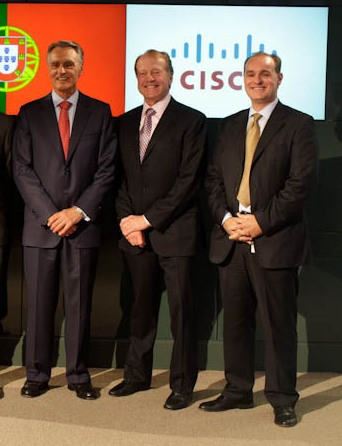
Former Portuguese President Cavaco Silva, former Cisco CEO John Chambers and Cisco Senior Director of Innovation Helder Antunes, during the 2011 presidential visit to the US

On July 23, 2013, Cisco Systems announced a definitive agreement to acquire Sourcefire for $2.7 billion. On August 14, 2013, Cisco Systems announced it would cut 4,000 jobs from its workforce, which was roughly 6%, starting in 2014. At the end of 2013, Cisco announced poor revenue due to depressed sales in emerging markets, caused by economic uncertainty and by fears of the National Security Agency planting backdoors in its products.

In April 2014, Cisco announced funding for early-stage firms to focus on the Internet of Things. The investment fund was allocated to investments in IoT accelerators and startups such as The Alchemist Accelerator, Ayla Networks and EVRYTHNG. Later that year, the company announced it was laying off another 6,000 workers or 8% of its global workforce, as part of a second restructuring. On November 4, 2014, Cisco announced an investment in Stratoscale.

In July 2014, it was again among the most valuable companies, with a market cap of about US$129 billion.

On May 4, 2015, Cisco announced CEO and Chairman John Chambers would step down as CEO on July 26, 2015, but remain chairman. Chuck Robbins, senior vice president of worldwide sales & operations and 17-year Cisco veteran, was announced as the next CEO. On July 23, 2015, Cisco announced the divestiture of its television set-top-box and cable modem business to Technicolor SA for $600 million, a division originally formed by Cisco's $6.9 billion purchase of Scientific Atlanta. The deal came as part of Cisco's gradual exit from the consumer market, and as part of an effort by Cisco's new leadership to focus on cloud-based products in enterprise segments. Cisco indicated that it would still collaborate with Technicolor on video products. On November 19, 2015, Cisco, alongside ARM Holdings, Dell, Intel, Microsoft and Princeton University, founded the OpenFog Consortium, to promote interests and development in fog computing.

In January 2016, Cisco invested in VeloCloud, a software-defined WAN (SD-WAN) start-up with a cloud offering for configuring and optimizing branch office networks. Cisco contributed to VeloCloud's $27 million Series C round, led by March Capital Partners.

In February 2017, Cisco launched a cloud-based secure internet gateway, called Cisco Umbrella, to provide safe internet access to users who do not use their corporate networks or VPNs to connect to remote data centers. Immediately after reporting its fourth-quarter earnings for 2017, Cisco's price-per-share value jumped by over 7%, while its earnings per share ratio increased from 60 to 61 cents per share, due in part to Cisco's outperformance of analyst expectations. In September 2017, Chambers announced that he would step down from the executive chairman role at the end of his term on the board in December 2017. On December 11, 2017, Robbins was elected to succeed Chambers as executive chairman while retaining his role as CEO, and Chambers was given the title of "Chairman Emeritus".

Reuters reported that "Cisco Systems Inc's (CSCO.O) product revenue in Russia grew 20 percent in 2017, ahead of Cisco's technology product revenue growth in the other so-called BRIC countries of Brazil, China and India." As of 2017, Cisco Systems shares were mainly held by institutional investors, including The Vanguard Group, BlackRock, and State Street Corporation.

On May 1, 2018, Cisco Systems agreed to buy AI-driven business intelligence startup Accompany for $270 million. As of June 2018, Cisco Systems ranked 444th on Forbes Global 2000 list, with $221.3 billion market cap.

In 2019, Cisco acquired CloudCherry, a customer experience management company, and Voicea, an artificial intelligence company.

In 2019, Cisco also introduced the "Silicon One" ASIC chip with the G100 model reaching a speed of 25.6 Tbit/s. The Silicon One competes against the Tomahawk series by Broadcom the Nvidia Spectrum, the Marvell Teralynx and the Intel Tofino. In 2023, the Silicon One G200 will offer a speed of 51.2 Tbit/s.

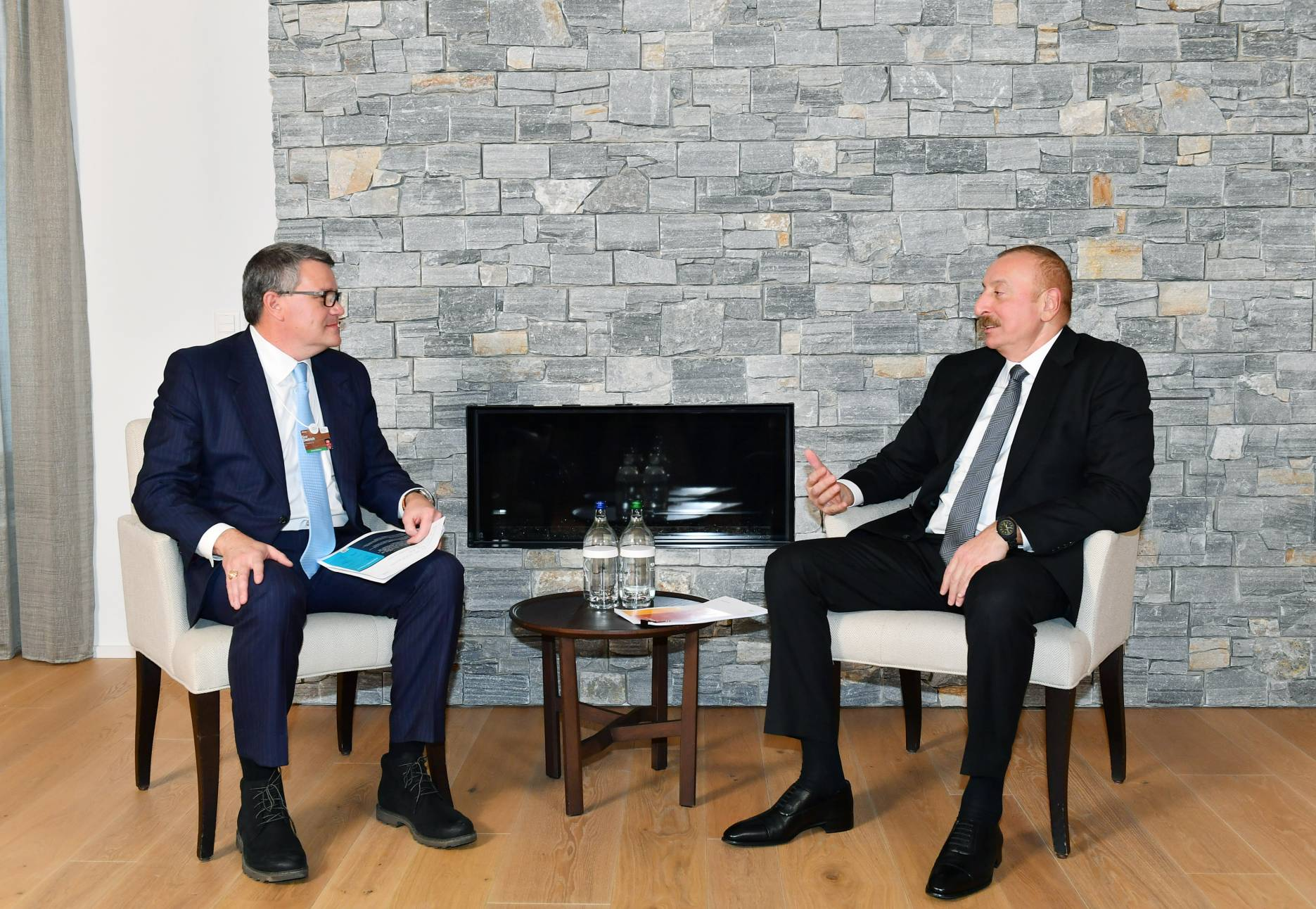
Cisco's Senior Vice President Guy Diedrich with Azerbaijan's President Ilham Aliyev in Davos, Switzerland in January 2023

In March 2020, SVP and GM of Enterprise Networking David Goeckeler left to become CEO of Western Digital. and was replaced by Todd Nightingale, head of Cisco Meraki. In August 2020, Cisco announced the creation of a new 130,000 square feet Midwest headquarters in Chicago at the Old Chicago Main Post Office accommodating 1,200 employees. Cisco maintains over 200 corporate offices in more than 80 countries.

In 2021, Cisco shares reached $46.25, remaining 42 percent below their 2000 peak.

In October 2022, Cisco announced a partnership adding the Microsoft Teams app to its meeting devices.

Cisco completely curtailed sales of its equipment in Russia after the 2022 Russian invasion of Ukraine, and completely discontinued service for already-sold devices. In April 2023, it became known that the company had destroyed equipment, spare parts, and even vehicles and office furniture worth 1.86 billion rubles (about $23 million) due to the impossibility of re-exporting. In February 2023, Cisco also wrote off the debt of the Russian mobile operator MTS in the amount of 1.234 billion rubles. As expected, these are unpaid amounts for previous equipment deliveries. In 2023, Cisco announced plans to begin manufacturing equipment in India.

On February 15, 2024, Cisco announced it would lay off more than 4,000 employees, or 5% of its global workforce, and lowered its annual revenue forecast due to economic challenges and reduced demand from telecom and cable service providers.

In March 2024, Cisco Systems received unconditional EU antitrust approval for its $28 billion bid for cybersecurity firm Splunk.

On April 24, 2024, Chuck Robbins, CEO of Cisco, met with Pope Francis and signed the Rome Call for AI ethics at the Vatican, endorsing the document's principles for responsible and ethical AI use.

On August 14, 2024, Cisco announced it would lay off another 7% of employees as part of an effort to consolidate its networking, security, and collaboration teams. At the same time, it announced $10.3 billion in profit for the fiscal year.

In October 2024 Cisco consolidated its corporate offices in the Bay Area and moved its main headquarters to the former Splunk office on the south side of Santana Row in San Jose.

On August 13, 2025, Cisco announced it would eliminate 221 positions across its Milpitas and San Francisco offices. At the same time, the company announced an 8% increase in revenue for the fiscal year.

As of June 24, 2026, Cisco's market cap was $471.91 billion.

In July 2026, Cisco was named Official Network Supplier of The R&A, providing networking infrastructure for major golf championships including The Open and the AIG Women's Open, as well as The R&A's new global headquarters in St Andrews.

In August 2026, Cisco reported record revenue of $63.3 billion for fiscal year 2026, an increase of 12% from the previous fiscal year. The company reported growing demand for its networking and artificial intelligence infrastructure, with $9.3 billion in AI-infrastructure orders during the fiscal year and approximately $4 billion in AI infrastructure revenue.

In late August 2026, Cisco announced an expansion of its Secure AI Factory with Nvidia through a partnership with Supermicro, adding high-density liquid and air-cooled AI computing systems to its portfolio. The expanded platform was designed for enterprise, neocloud, and sovereign-could customers and was expected to become available in October 2026.

Also in August 2026, Cisco launched its Sovereign Critical Infrastructure portfolio in Canada, supporting on-premises and air-gapped deployments for government, financial, healthcare, and other critical-infrastructure organizations.

In 2026, Cisco introduced its Silicon One G300 switching chip, designed to support large-scale AI workloads in data center networks.

== Financials ==
Year	Revenue (mil. US$)	Net income (mil. US$)	Total assets (mil. US$)	Price per share (US$)	Employees
2000	18,928	2,668	32,870	48.87	
2001	22,293	−1,014	35,238	16.69	
2002	18,915	1,893	37,795	11.80	
2003	18,878	3,578	37,107	14.38	
2004	22,045	4,401	35,594	17.44	
2005	24,801	5,741	33,883	14.67	
2006	28,484	5,580	43,315	17.45	49,930
2007	34,922	7,333	53,340	23.07	61,560
2008	39,540	8,052	58,734	18.15	66,130
2009	36,117	6,134	68,128	16.14	65,550
2010	40,040	7,767	81,130	18.74	70,700
2011	43,218	6,490	87,095	14.10	71,830
2012	46,061	8,041	91,759	15.34	66,640
2013	48,607	9,983	101,191	19.20	75,049
2014	47,142	7,853	105,070	21.22	74,042
2015	49,161	8,981	113,373	25.09	71,833
2016	49,247	10,739	121,652	26.83	73,700
2017	48,005	9,609	129,818	31.97	72,900
2018	49,330	110	108,784	43.65	74,200
2019	51,904	11,621	97,793	55.84	75,900
2020	49,301	11,214	97,793	—	77,500
2021	49,818	10,591	97,497	53.30	79,500
2022	51,557	11,812	94,002	44.02	83,300
2023	56,998	12,613	101,852	50.49	84,900
2024	53,803	10,320	124,413	46.80	90,400
2025	56,654	10,180	122,291	64.65	86,200

== Acquisitions and subsidiaries ==
Cisco acquired a variety of companies to spin products and talent into the company. In 1995–1996 the company completed 11 acquisitions. Several acquisitions, such as Stratacom, were one of the biggest deals in the industry when they occurred. During the Internet boom in 1999, the company acquired Cerent Corporation, a start-up company located in Petaluma, California, for about US$7 billion. It was the most expensive acquisition made by Cisco to that date, and only the acquisition of Scientific Atlanta has been larger. In 1999, Cisco also acquired a stake for $1 billion in KPMG Consulting to enable establishing Internet firm Metrius founded by Keyur Patel of Fuse. Several acquired companies have grown into $1Bn+ business units for Cisco, including LAN switching, Enterprise Voice over Internet Protocol (VOIP) platform Webex and home networking. The latter came as result of Cisco acquiring Linksys in 2003 and in 2010 was supplemented with new product line dubbed Cisco Valet.

Cisco announced on January 12, 2005, that it would acquire Airespace for US$450 million to reinforce the wireless controller product lines.

Cisco announced on January 4, 2007, that it would buy IronPort in a deal valued at US$830 million and completed the acquisition on June 25, 2007. IronPort was best known for its IronPort AntiSpam, its SenderBase email reputation service and its email security appliances. Accordingly, IronPort was integrated into the Cisco Security business unit. Ironport's Senderbase was renamed as Sensorbase to take account of the input into this database that other Cisco devices provide. SensorBase allows these devices to build a risk profile on IP addresses, therefore allowing risk profiles to be dynamically created on http sites and SMTP email sources.

In 2010, Cisco bought Starent Networks (a mobile packet core company) for $2.9 billion and Moto Development Group, a product design consulting firm that helped develop Cisco's Flip video camera. Also in 2010, Cisco became a key stakeholder in e-Skills Week. In March 2011, Cisco completed the acquisition of privately held network configuration and change management software company Pari Networks.

Although many buy-ins (such as Crescendo Networks in 1993, Tandberg in 2010) resulted in acquisition of flagship technology to Cisco, many others have failed—partially or completely. For instance, in 2010 Cisco occupied a meaningful share of the packet-optical market, revenues were still not on par with US$7 billion price tag paid in 1999 for Cerent. Some of acquired technologies (such as Flip from Pure Digital) saw their product lines terminated.

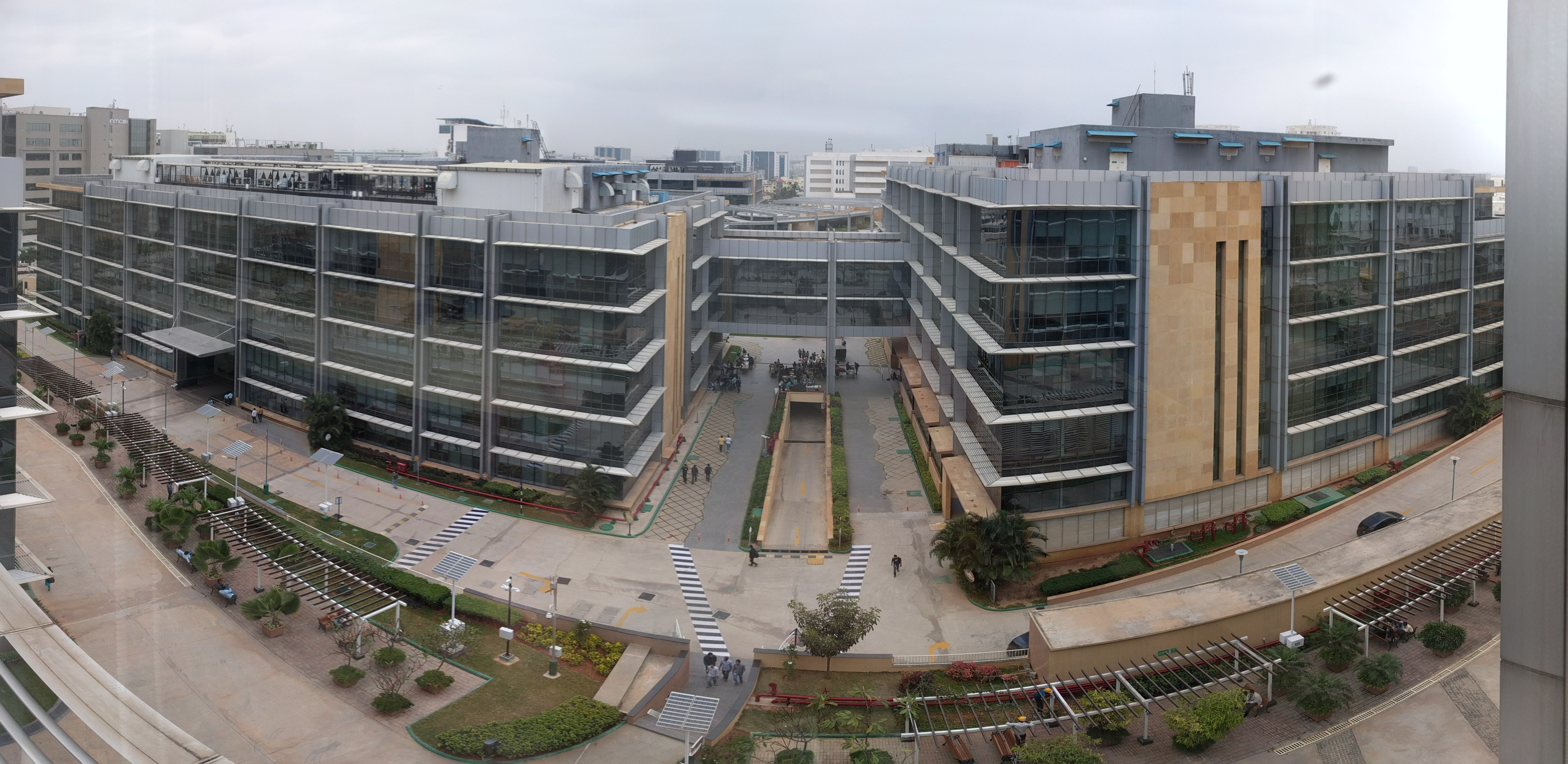
Cisco Systems in Bengaluru, India

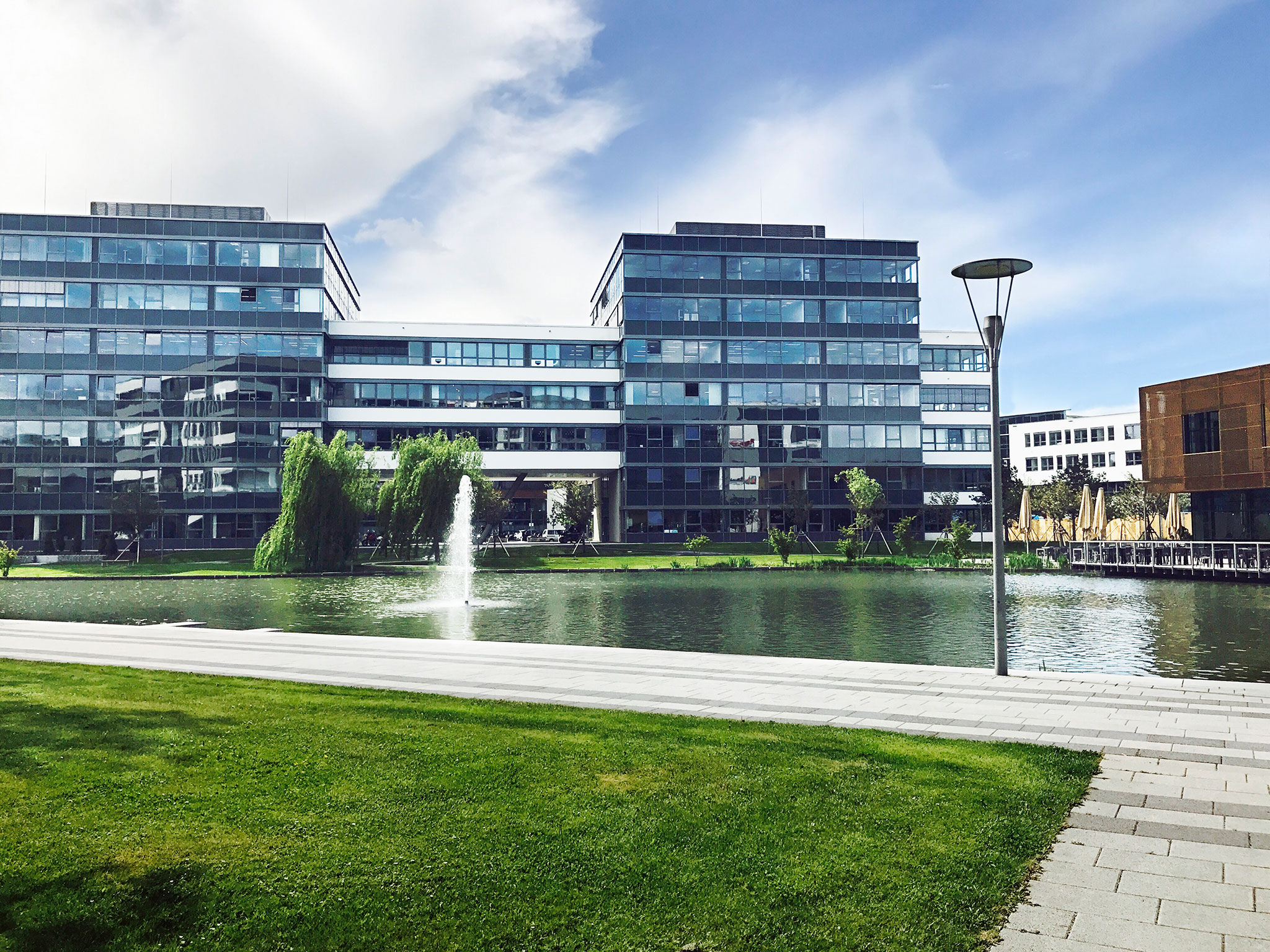
Munich, Germany

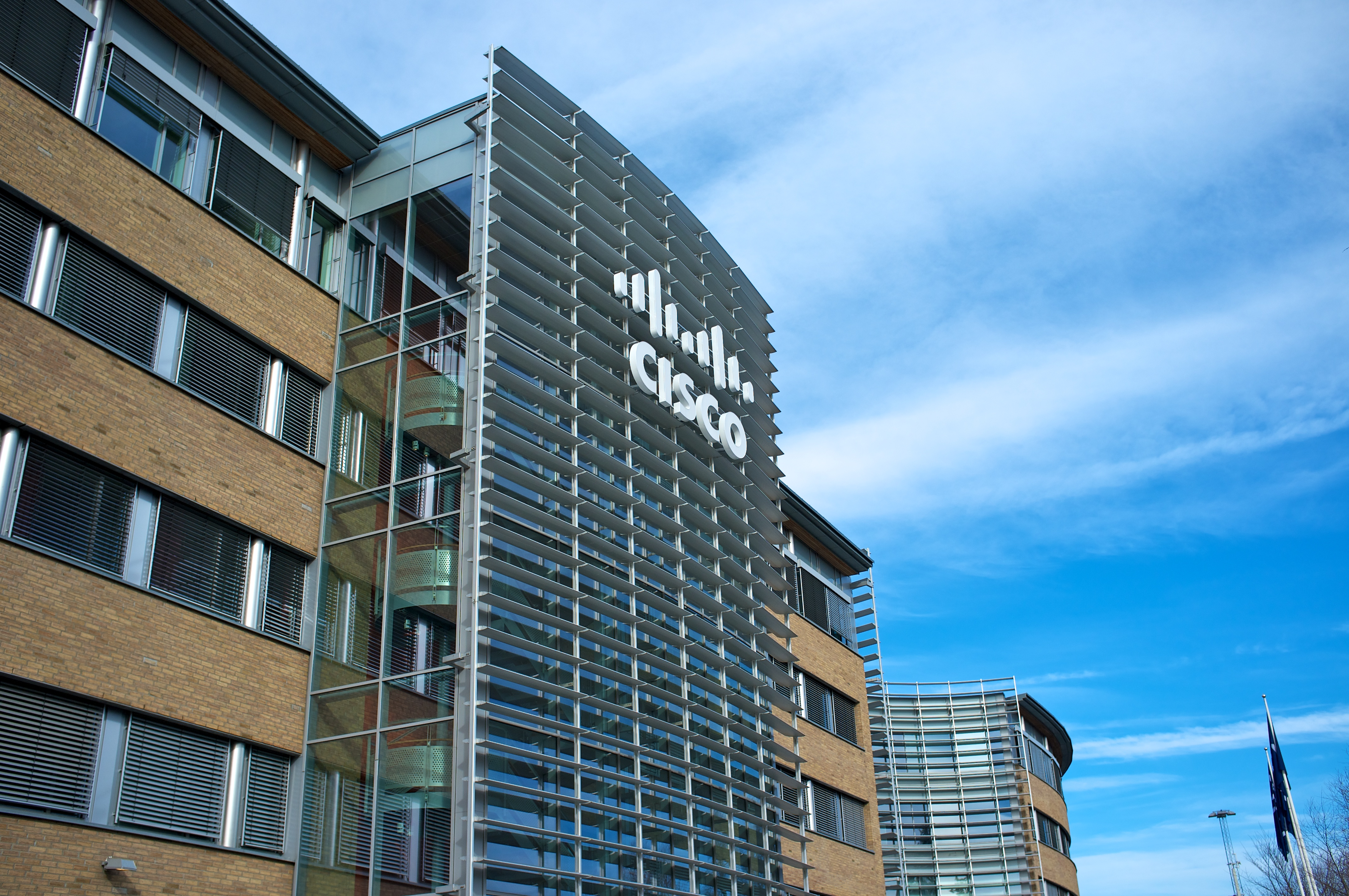
Oslo, Norway

Cisco campuses all over the world

Cisco announced on March 15, 2012, that it would acquire NDS Group for $5bn.

In January 2013, Cisco Systems acquired Israeli software maker Intucell for around $475 million in cash, a move to expand its mobile network management offerings. In the same month, Cisco Systems acquired Cognitive Security, a company focused on Cyber Threat Protection. Cisco also acquired SolveDirect (cloud services) in March 2013 and UK-based Ubiquisys (mobile software) in April 2013 for $310 million.

Cisco acquired cyber-security firm Sourcefire, in October 2013. On June 16, 2014, Cisco announced that it has completed the acquisition of ThreatGRID, a company that provided dynamic malware analysis and threat intelligence technology.

On June 17, 2014, Cisco announced its intent to acquire privately held Tail-f Systems, a leader in configuration management software.

On April 2, 2015, Cisco announced plans to buy Embrane, a software-defined networking startup. The deal will give Cisco Embrane's software platform, which provides layer 3–7 network services for things such as firewalls, VPN termination, server load balancers and SSL offload.

On May 7, 2015, Cisco announced plans to buy Tropo, a cloud API platform that simplifies the addition of real-time communications and collaboration capabilities within applications.

On June 30, 2015, Cisco acquired privately held OpenDNS, the company best known for its DNS service that adds a level of security by monitoring domain name requests.

On August 6, 2015, Cisco announced that it has completed the acquisition of privately held MaintenanceNet, the US-based company best known for its cloud-based contract management platform ServiceExchange. On the same month, Cisco acquired Pawaa, a privately held company in Bangalore, India that provides secure on-premises and cloud-based file-sharing software.

On September 30, 2015, Cisco announced its intent to acquire privately held Portcullis Computer Security, a UK-based company that provides cybersecurity services to enterprise clients and the government sectors.

On October 26, 2015, Cisco announced its intent to acquire ParStream, a privately held company based in Cologne, Germany, that provides an analytics database that allows companies to analyze large amounts of data and store it in near real-time anywhere in the network.

On October 27, 2015, Cisco announced that it would acquire Lancope, a company that focuses on detecting threat activity, for $452.5 million in a cash-and-equity deal.

On June 28, 2016, Cisco announced its intent to acquire CloudLock, a privately held cloud security company founded in 2011 by three Israeli military veterans, for $293 million. The acquisition was completed on August 1, 2016.

In August 2016, Cisco announced it is getting closer to making a deal to acquire Springpath, the startup whose technology is used in Cisco's HyperFlex Systems. Cisco already owns an undisclosed stake in the hyper-converged provider. In September 2023, Cisco announced discontinuation of its HyperFlex infrastructure products.

In January 2017, Cisco announced it would acquire AppDynamics, a company that monitors application performance, for $3.7 billion. The acquisition came just one day before AppDynamics was set to IPO.

On January 26, 2017, Cisco founded the Innovation Alliance in Germany with eleven other companies bringing together 40 sites and 2,000 staff to provide small businesses in Germany with expertise.

On August 1, 2017, Cisco completed the acquisition of Viptela Inc. for $610 million in cash and assumed equity awards. Viptela was a privately held software-defined wide area network (SD-WAN) company based in San Jose, Ca.

On October 23, 2017, Cisco Systems announced it would be acquiring Broadsoft for $1.9 Billion to further entrench itself in the cloud communication and collaboration area.

On October 1, 2018, Cisco completed its acquisition of Ann Arbor–based Duo Security in a deal valued at about $2.35 billion.

On August 7, 2020, Cisco completed its acquisition of network intelligence company ThousandEyes for around $1 billion.

On October 1, 2020, Cisco announced that it would be acquiring Israeli startup Portshift for a reported $100 million.

On December 7, 2020, Cisco announced that it would be acquiring Slido to improve Q&A, polls and engagement in WebEx videoconferencing

On December 7, 2020, Cisco announced the acquisition of U.K based IMImobile in a $730M deal.

On May 3, 2021, Cisco completed its acquisition of Q&A and polling platform Slido, which it offered both as a standalone product and with integrations.

In 2023, Cisco acquired the following cybersecurity companies: Valtix, Lightspin, and Armorblox. Cisco also announced its intention to acquire networking and security startup Isovalent later that year.

On September 21, 2023, Cisco announced the acquisition of cybersecurity firm Splunk in a $28 billion deal, its biggest acquisition yet, and the acquisition is announced to be completed on March 18, 2024.

== Products and services ==
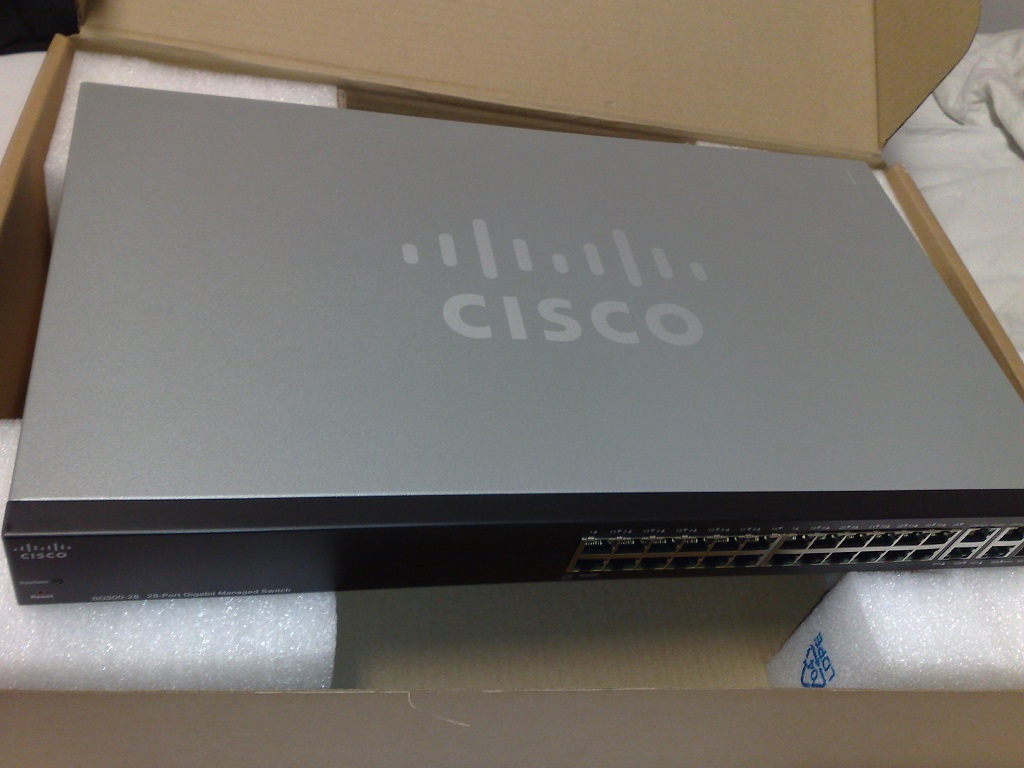
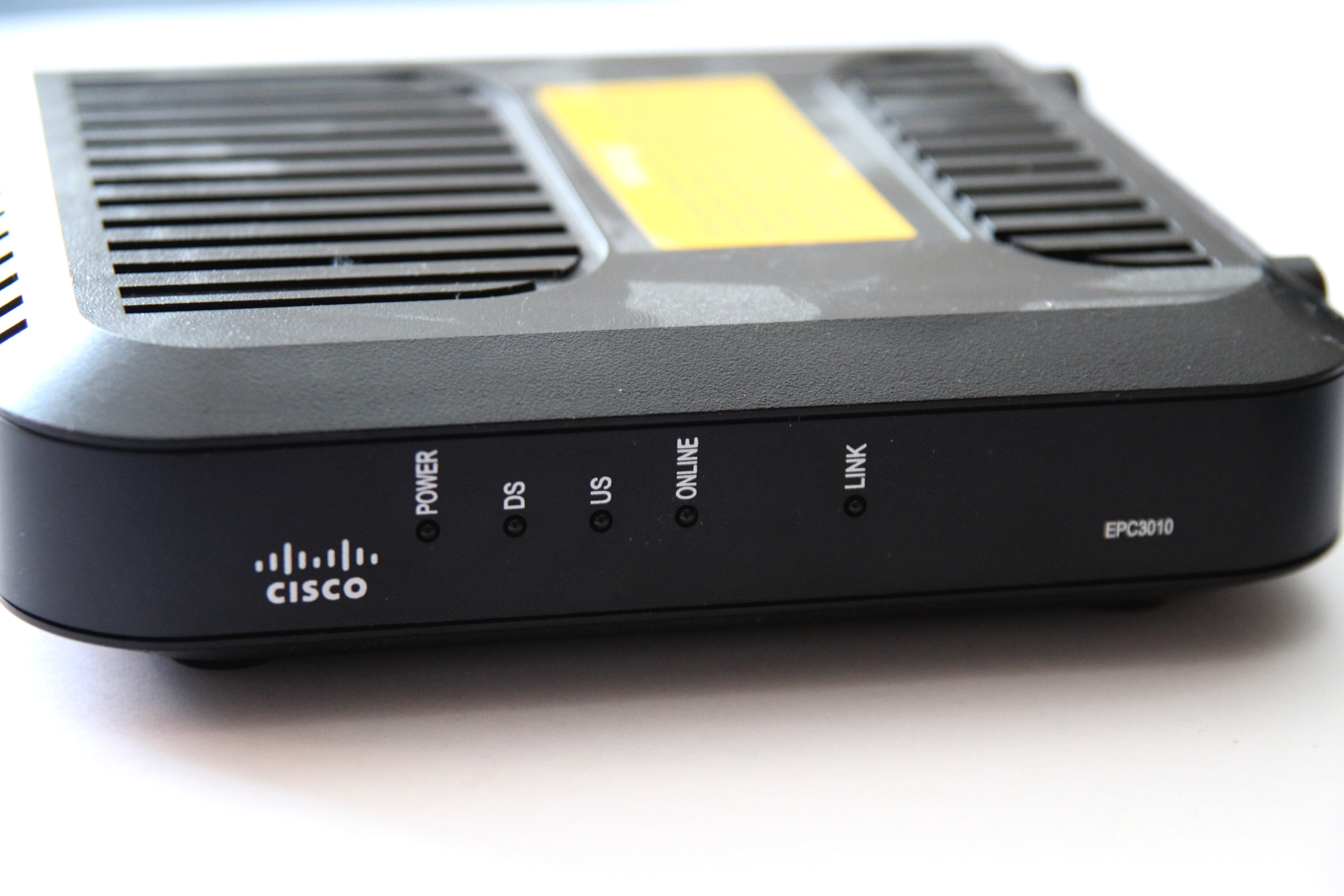
Cisco SG300-28 Rackmount switch (top) and Cisco EPC-3010 modem (bottom)

Cisco provides IT products and services across five major technology areas: networking, security, collaboration, data center and IoT.

Cisco is the dominant vendor in the Australian market across all market segments. It uses its Australian office as one of the main headquarters for the Asia-Pacific region.

=== Hosted Collaboration Solution (HCS) ===
Cisco partners offer cloud-based services based on Cisco's virtualized Unified Computing System (UCS). The Cisco Unified Services Delivery Solution includes hosted versions of Cisco Unified Communications Manager (UCM), Cisco Unified Contact Center, Cisco Unified Mobility, Cisco Unified Presence, Cisco Unity Connection (unified messaging) and Cisco Webex Meeting Center.

=== Network Emergency Response ===
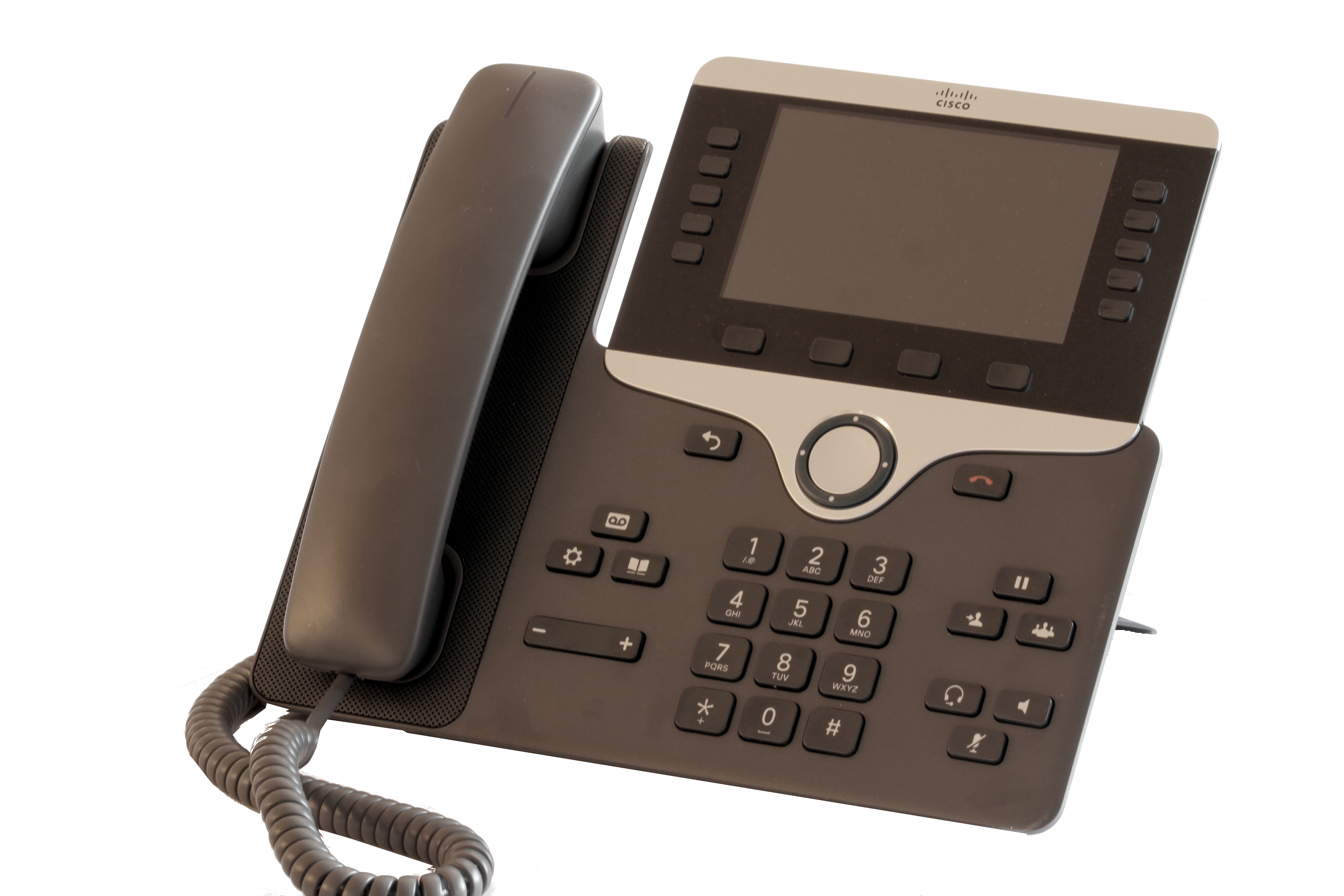
A Cisco 8851 IP phone

As part of its Crisis Response initiative, Cisco maintains several Network Emergency Response Vehicles (NERV)s. The vehicles are maintained and deployed by Cisco employees during natural disasters and other public crises. The vehicles are self-contained and provide wired and wireless services including voice and radio interoperability, voice over IP, network-based video surveillance and secured high-definition video-conferencing for leaders and first responders in crisis areas with up to 3-72 Mbit/s of bandwidth (up and down) via a 1.8-meter satellite antenna.

NERVs are based at Cisco headquarters sites in San Jose, California, and at Research Triangle Park, North Carolina, allowing strategic deployment in North America. They can become fully operational within 15 minutes of arrival. High-capacity diesel fuel-tanks allow the largest vehicles to run for up to 72 hours continuously. The NERV has been deployed to incidents such as the October 2007 California wildfires; hurricanes Gustav, Ike and Katrina; the 2010 San Bruno gas pipeline explosion, tornado outbreaks in North Carolina and Alabama in 2011; and Hurricane Sandy in 2012.

The Crisis Response Operations team maintains and deploys smaller, more portable communication kits to emergencies outside of North America. In 2010, the team deployed to assist in earthquake recovery in Haiti and Christchurch (New Zealand). In 2011, they deployed to flooding in Brazil, as well as in response to the 2011 earthquake and tsunami in Japan.

In 2011, Cisco received the Innovation Preparedness award from the American Red Cross Silicon Valley Chapter for its development and use of these vehicles in disasters.

=== Certifications ===
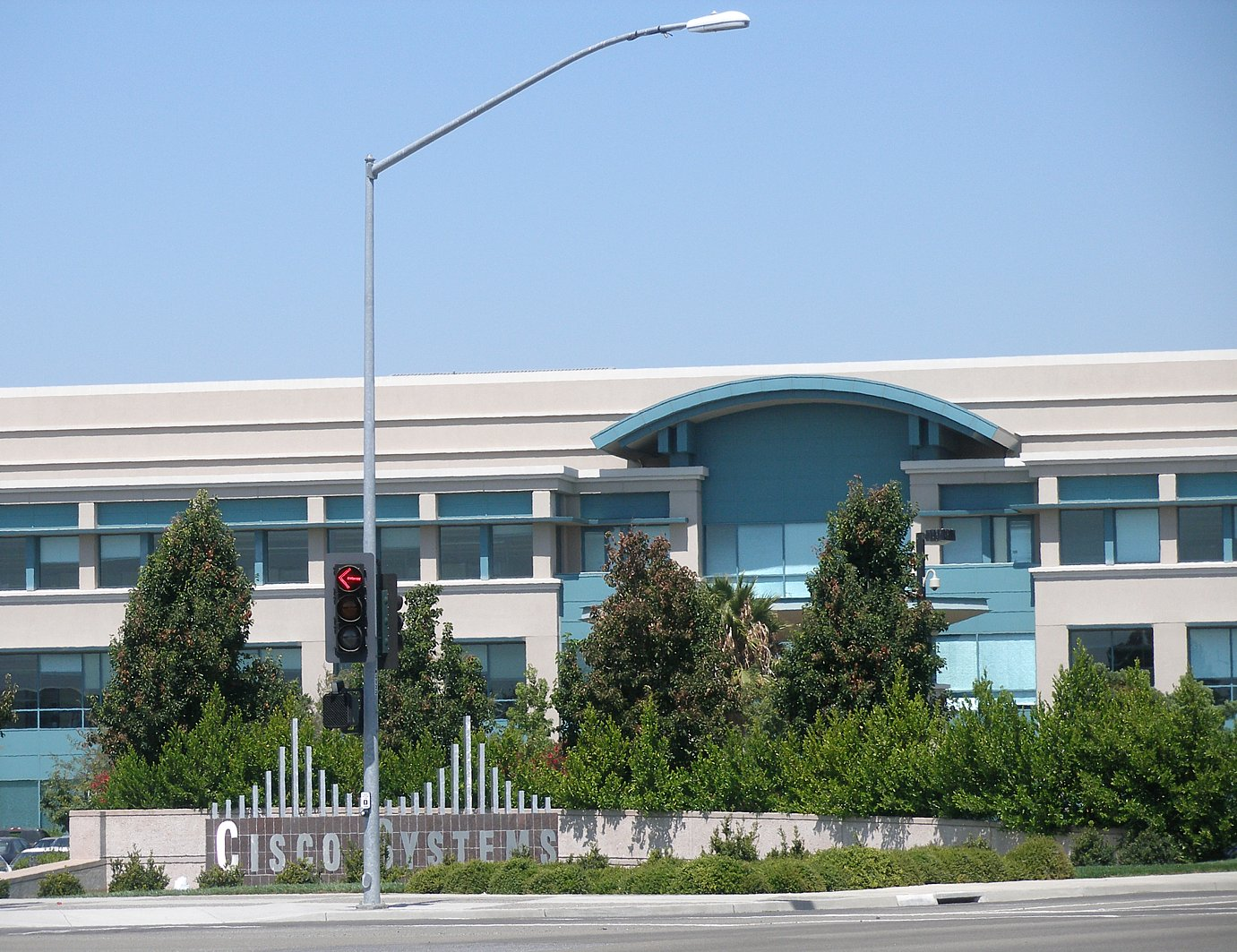
Cisco headquarters in the North San Jose Innovation District

Cisco Systems also sponsors a line of IT professional certifications for Cisco products. There are four levels of certification: Entry (CCST), Associate (CCNA), Professional (CCNP), and Expert (CCIE/CCDE), across eight technology paths, including Collaboration, CyberOps, Data Center, DevNet, Enterprise, Security, and Service Provider. In 2022, Cisco launched Cisco U., a subscription-based online learning platform offering certification preparation and skills training for IT professionals, replacing the company's previous Cisco Digital Learning Library. Cisco also provides training for these certifications via a portal called the Cisco Networking Academy. Qualifying schools can become members of the Cisco Networking Academy and then provide CCNA level or other level courses. Cisco Academy Instructors must be CCNA certified to be a CCAI certified instructor.

== Corporate affairs ==
=== Facilities ===
Cisco is headquartered in San Jose, California at 170 West Tasman Dr. with dozens of buildings comprising its corporate campus. Over 15,000 full-time employees are based at the San Jose campus and the surrounding Bay Area. Cisco's second largest campus in the United States is located at Research Triangle Park in North Carolina with 7,000 employees spanning across 12 buildings.

=== Awards and accolades ===
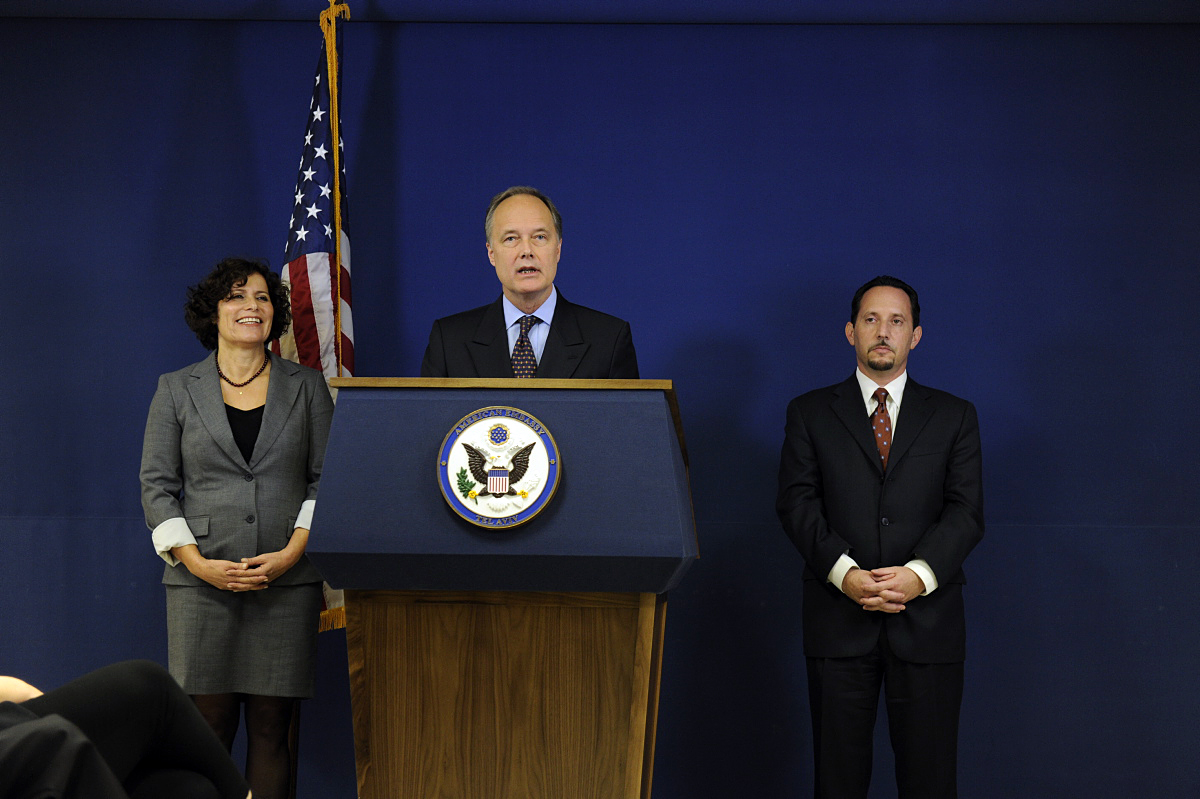
In 2010, Secretary of State Hillary Clinton awarded Cisco the Secretary of State's Award for Corporate Excellence, which was presented in Jerusalem by Ambassador James B. Cunningham to Cisco Senior Manager Zika Abzuk.

Cisco products, including IP phones and Telepresence, have been seen in movies and TV series. The company was featured in the documentary film Something Ventured which premiered in 2011.

Cisco was a 2002–03 recipient of the Ron Brown Award, a U.S. presidential honor to recognize companies "for the exemplary quality of their relationships with employees and communities". Cisco ranked number one in Great Place to Work's World's Best Workplaces 2019. In 2020, Fortune magazine ranked Cisco Systems at number four on their Fortune List of the Top 100 Companies to Work For in 2020 based on an employee survey of satisfaction.

According to a report by technology consulting firm LexInnova, Cisco was one of the leading recipients of network security-related patents with the largest portfolio within other companies (6,442 security-related patents) in 2015.

In 2024, Cisco was awarded Best Office Phone for its CP-8861 model by PhonePrices.co.uk.

=== Sponsorship ===
In February 2021, Webex signed a multi-year partnership with McLaren Racing as the Official Collaboration Partner of the team. In the following year, the partnership was extended to Cisco as the Official Technology Partner of the team. In October 2023, Cisco was announced as the Official Primary Partner of the McLaren F1 Academy programme. Cisco's branding will be carried on Bianca Bustamante's car, race suit and team kit in the 2024 F1 Academy season.

== Controversies ==
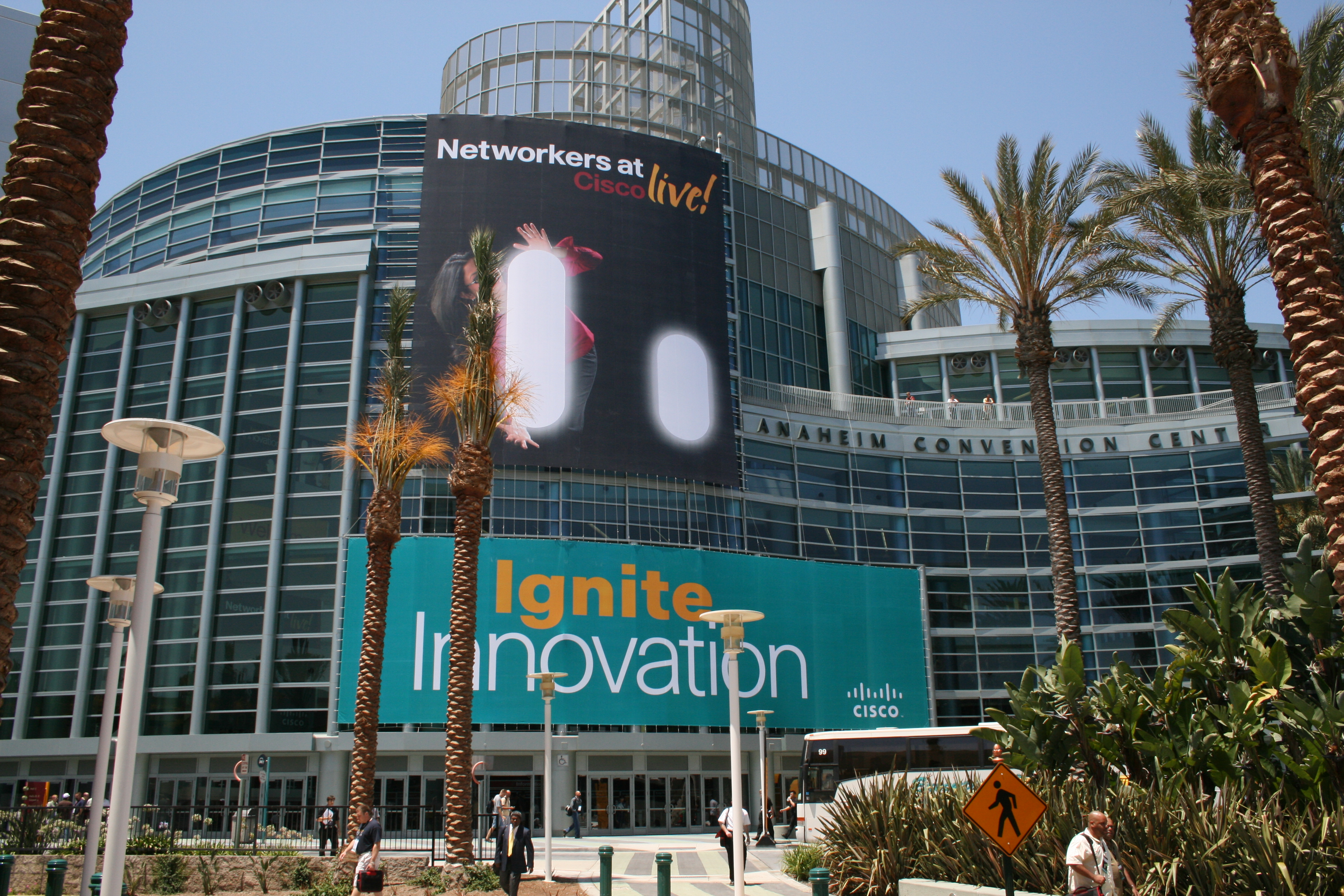
Cisco Live 2007 in Anaheim, California. Cisco Live is the company's annual exposition and conference.

=== Shareholder relations ===
A class action lawsuit filed on April 20, 2001, accused Cisco of making misleading statements that "were relied on by purchasers of Cisco stock" and of insider trading. While Cisco denied all allegations in the suit, on August 18, 2006, Cisco's liability insurers, its directors and officers paid the plaintiffs US$91.75 million to settle the suit.

=== Intellectual property disputes ===
On December 11, 2008, the Free Software Foundation filed suit against Cisco regarding Cisco's failure to comply with the GPL and LGPL licenses and make the applicable source code publicly available. On May 20, 2009, Cisco settled this lawsuit by complying with FSF licensing terms and making a monetary contribution to the FSF.

In October 2020, Cisco was ordered to pay US$1.9 billion to Centripetal Networks for infringement on four cybersecurity patents.

=== China ===
Cisco has been criticized for its involvement in censorship in the People's Republic of China. According to author Ethan Gutmann, Cisco and other telecommunications equipment providers supplied the Chinese government with surveillance and Internet infrastructure equipment that is used to block Internet websites and track online activities in China. Cisco has stated that it does not customize or develop specialized or unique filtering capabilities to enable governments to block access to information and that it sells the same equipment in China as it sells worldwide.

Wired News had uncovered a purported leaked, confidential PowerPoint presentation from Cisco that detailed the commercial opportunities of the Golden Shield Project of Internet control. In May 2011, a group of Falun Gong practitioners filed a lawsuit under the Alien Tort Statute alleging that Cisco knowingly developed and customized its product to assist the Chinese government in prosecution and abuse of Falun Gong practitioners. The lawsuit was dismissed in September 2014 by the United States District Court for the Northern District of California, which decision was appealed to United States Court of Appeals for the Ninth Circuit in September 2015. On July 7, 2023, the Court of Appeals for the Ninth Circuit reversed the lower court's decision and ruled the lawsuit may proceed to trial. Cisco filed an appeal with the U.S. Supreme Court.

On April 28, 2026, the U.S. Supreme Court heard a case alleging that Cisco Systems aided the Chinese government in repressing Falun Gong members through its "Golden Shield" surveillance system. Filed in 2011 under the Alien Tort Statute, the lawsuit raises questions about corporate complicity in human rights abuses and the use of technology for government control in China.

In 2020, the Australian Strategic Policy Institute accused at least 82 major brands, including Cisco, of being connected to forced Uyghur labor in Xinjiang.

=== Tax fraud investigation ===
In October 2007, employees of Cisco's Brazilian unit were arrested on charges that they had imported equipment without paying import duties. In response, Cisco stated that it does not import directly into Brazil, and instead use middlemen.

=== Antitrust lawsuit ===
On December 1, 2008, Multiven filed an antitrust lawsuit against Cisco Systems, Inc. Multiven's complaint alleges that Cisco harmed Multiven and consumers by bundling and tying bug fixes/patches and updates for its operating system software to its maintenance services (SMARTnet). In May 2010, Cisco accused the person who filed the antitrust suit, British-Nigerian technology entrepreneur Peter Alfred-Adekeye, with hacking and pressured the US government to extradite him from Canada. Cisco settled the antitrust lawsuit two months after Alfred-Adekeye's arrest by making its software updates available to all Multiven customers.

=== Remotely monitoring users' connections ===
Cisco's Linksys E2700, E3500, E4500 devices have been reported to be remotely updated to a firmware version that forces users to register for a cloud service, allows Cisco to monitor their network use and ultimately shut down the cloud service account and thus render the affected router unusable.

=== Firewall backdoor developed by NSA ===
According to the German magazine Der Spiegel the NSA has developed JETPLOW for gaining access to ASA (series 5505, 5510, 5520, 5540 and 5550) and 500-series PIX Firewalls.

Cisco's Chief Security Officer addressed the allegations publicly and denied working with any government to weaken Cisco products for exploitation or to implement security backdoors.

A document included in the trove of National Security Agency files released with Glenn Greenwald's book No Place to Hide details how the agency's Tailored Access Operations (TAO) unit and other NSA employees intercept servers, routers and other network gear being shipped to organizations targeted for surveillance and install covert firmware onto them before they are delivered. These Trojan horse systems were described by an NSA manager as being "some of the most productive operations in TAO because they pre-position access points into hard target networks around the world."

Cisco denied the allegations in a customer document saying that no information was included about specific Cisco products, supply chain intervention or implant techniques, or new security vulnerabilities. Cisco's general counsel also said that Cisco does not work with any government, including the United States government, to weaken its products. The allegations are reported to have prompted the company's CEO to express concern to the President of the United States. Whistle blowers like Edward Snowden, and journalist reporter Julian Assange have echoed similar sentiments publicly.

=== Backdoor on Unified Communications Manager ===
In April 2025, it was found that Cisco had a backdoor in the Unified Communications Manager. In July 2025, Cisco removed the backdoor.

=== Spherix patent suit ===
In March 2014, Spherix Incorporated (now AIkido Pharma) initiated a patent infringement lawsuit against Cisco Systems in the U.S. District Court for the District of Delaware. Spherix alleged that Cisco's routers and switches infringed upon 11 patents it had acquired from the defunct Canadian telecommunications company Nortel Networks. The patents pertained to technologies related to networking and telecommunications equipment.

Spherix contended that Cisco's sales of these products in the United States over a five-year period, ending July 27, 2013, amounted to over $43 billion, the majority of which allegedly utilized the patented technologies. The lawsuit sought unspecified damages and accused Cisco of willful infringement.

In June 2015, the court ruled in favor of Cisco, granting summary judgment of non-infringement. The decision was based on the finding that Spherix had failed to demonstrate that Cisco's products infringed upon the asserted patents. Spherix subsequently dismissed its litigation against Cisco. In March 2020, Spherix changed its name to AIkido Pharma Inc.

=== India net censorship role ===
As of April 2020 Cisco Systems is alleged to be helping the Indian Jammu and Kashmir administration build a firewall that will prevent Internet users in Kashmir from accessing blacklisted websites, including social media portals, through fixed-line connections. Cisco denies the allegations.

=== Caste discrimination lawsuit ===
In 2020, a lawsuit was initiated against Cisco and two of its employees by the California Department of Fair Employment and Housing for alleged discrimination against an Indian engineer on account of him being from a lower caste than them.

=== Israeli-Palestinian conflict ===
The Israeli military uses Cisco data centers to support its AI targeting operations in the Gaza Strip and other defense and intelligence activities. At least 32 Cisco employees lost 288 family members in Gaza since October 2023. Employees who have spoken out against Cisco's ties to Israel have been fired, attempts to organize employees in support of divestment have been censored, and the company banned discussion of the conflict in company meetings in April 2025.

== See also ==
- Mass surveillance in the United States
- Cisco certifications
- Cisco IOS
- Packet Tracer
- Cisco Catalyst
- Cisco DevNet
- Cisco Express Forwarding
- Cisco Discovery Protocol
- Cisco Security Agent
- Cisco Systems VPN Client
- Cisco WebEx
- Cisco Field

Preceded by General Motors	Dow Jones Industrial Average component June 8, 2009 – present	Incumbent
