= Juniper E-Series =

Series of broadband services routers manufactured by Juniper Networks

- Manufacturer: Juniper Networks
- Type: Network router
- Processor: Internet processor

Juniper E-Series is a series of broadband services routers or edge routers manufactured by Juniper Networks. The E series was originally developed by Unisphere Networks, which Juniper acquired in 2002. These routers provide multiple services including broadband remote access server, broadband video services, dedicated access, 802.11 Wireless subscriber management, VOIP, internet access, security services, network address translation (NAT) etc. on a single platform. The carrier-class architecture of E-series routers allows to combine Broadband Remote Access Server (B-RAS) and dedicated access capabilities (T1/E1 and above) on a single and integrated platform. The E-series routes runs on JUNOSe software compared to other series of routers of Juniper which runs on JUNOS.

== Models and Platforms ==
The Juniper E-series includes six different models that are designed to address the variety of Service Provider requirements. The specific models include the high-capacity E320 BSR and ERX-1440 platforms, the mid-range ERX-1410 platform, compact ERX-710 and ERX-705 platforms, and the highly compact ERX-310. All E-series platforms use a single version of the JUNOSe operating system, and support a full suite of Internet routing protocols, including BGP-4, IS-IS, OSPF, and RIP.

=== E120 ===
The Juniper E120 router is a high-performance router used primarily for small to medium-sized points of presence (PoPs) and central offices. The E120 has a 120 Gbit/s switch fabric and hosts up to six line modules that support OC3/STM1 through OC48c/STM16 and 10 Gigabit Ethernet rates.

=== E320 ===
The Juniper E320 router is a high-performance router used primarily for large points of presence (PoPs). The box supports a 100 Gbit/s or a 320 Gbit/s switch fabric and hosts up to 12 line modules that support OC3/STM1 through OC48c/STM16 and 10 Gigabit Ethernet interfaces with the ability to support 96,000 subscribers. The E320 was designed with video in mind, adding the Quality of service (QOS) and high availability that carriers want for IPTV, as well as a huge increase in density. Cisco Systems has two boxes selling into this space: the 10000 series, considered Cisco's primary B-RAS entry, and the 7600 line of edge routers (of which the 7613 is the largest), which include some B-RAS capabilities. The B-RAS Backplane Switching Capacities of E320 supports up to 320 Gbit/s compared to 256 Gbit/s of Cisco 7613.

=== ERX310 ===
The Juniper ERX310 is a compact but high-performance router that has a 10 Gbit/s switch fabric, two slots dedicated to line modules, and supports up to OC12c/STM4 and Gigabit Ethernet interfaces. The 3-slot router contains a 10 Gbit/s switch fabric /route processor (SRP) and the rest of the two slots dedicated to line modules.

=== ERX705 ===
The Juniper ERX705 is a compact router that is used for small and medium-sized circuit aggregation applications. They can be configured with a 5 Gbit/s or 10 Gbit/s switch fabric (optional switch fabric redundancy), has five slots for line modules, and supports up to OC12c/STM4 and Gigabit Ethernet interfaces. These 7-slot router contains either a 5 Gbit/s or 10 Gbit/s switch fabric / route processor (SRP) with optional SRP redundancy for high availability and 5 slots dedicated to line modules.

=== ERX710 ===
The Juniper ERX710 is mainly used for medium-sized and large circuit aggregation applications. They have a 5 Gbit/s switch fabric with optional redundancy, five slots for line modules, and supports up to OC12c/STM4 and Gigabit Ethernet interfaces. The ERX-705 and ERX-710 routers utilize the same line modules and I/Os used across the entire E-series product line.

=== ERX1410 ===
The Juniper ERX1410 is an edge router that is used for large circuit aggregation applications. They have a 10 Gbit/s switch fabric with optional redundancy, 12 line module slots, and supports up to OC12c/STM4 and Gigabit Ethernet interfaces.

=== ERX1440 ===
The Juniper ERX1440 is a high-performance router is used for small to medium-sized points of presence (PoPs). The ERX1440 has a 40 Gbit/s switch fabric with optional redundancy, 12 line module slots, and supports up to OC48c/STM16 and Gigabit Ethernet interfaces.

== Features ==
The ERX system uses a modular, carrier-class design with a passive midplane, active front-insert line modules, and high-reliability, rear-insert input/output (I/O) modules. All chassis types use the same line modules and I/O modules. The 7-slot and 14-slot systems support full redundancy and line module hot-swapping to optimize network uptime.

The E-series JUNOSe system software and applications supports stateful Switch Route Processor switchover capabilities. The high availability for subscriber management applications, including all Point-to-Point Protocol and Dynamic Host Configuration Protocol access options, means that all subscriber sessions and services remain active during failure.

These routers maintain an entire routing table per port, which removes the route processor from the forwarding path and provides wire speed performance IP traffic streams, a process aided by Juniper developed ASIC technology.

The E-series supports subscriber management features in order to effectively aggregate traffic from access multiplexers, terminate Point-to-Point Protocol (PPP) sessions, and enforce QoS policies on a per flow and per subscriber basis. Features includes support for DHCP, PPPoE, PPPoA, PAP, and CHAP, domain parsing based on destination domain, IP address pooling, L2TP, LAC, LNS, RADIUS-initiated disconnect, RADIUS server support, auto-detection, Zero-Touch configuration, and TACACS+ etc.

The E-Series Modules supported are Channelized T3, Channelized OC3/STM-1 and OC12/STM-4 LM, Fast Ethernet/Gigabit Ethernet Line Modules, OC-3/STM-1 and OC-12/STM-4 ATM Line Modules, OC3/STM-1, OC12/STM-4 and OC48/STM-16 Packet over SONET Line Modules, Service Modules and IPSec Service Module etc.
