= Bertrand Serlet =

French software engineer and businessman

- Born: December 19, 1960 (age 65)
- Education: École normale supérieure Paris-Saclay
- Occupations: Software engineer, businessman
- Employer: Fungible Inc.

Bertrand Serlet (French: [bɛʁtʁɑ̃ sɛʁlɛ]; born 1960) is a French software engineer and businessman; he worked first at the Institut national de recherche en informatique et en automatique (INRIA) before leaving France for the United States in 1985. He was the Senior Vice President of Software Engineering at Apple Inc.

== Education ==
Serlet graduated from École normale supérieure Paris-Saclay. He holds a PhD in Computer Science from the Université Paris-Sud 11.

== Career ==
Serlet was the former Senior Vice President of Software Engineering at Apple Inc., where he worked from 1997 to 2011. He succeeded Avie Tevanian in the position in July 2003. In this position he was primarily responsible for the release of Mac OS X (including 10.4 Tiger, 10.5 Leopard and 10.6 Snow Leopard). He led development of the Workspace manager in NeXTSTEP and OPENSTEP.

Before joining Apple he worked at Xerox PARC and NeXT.

In 2001, Serlet and Tevanian initiated a secret project at the request of Steve Jobs, to sell MacOS on Vaio laptops. Apple demonstrated the product to Sony executives at a golf party in Hawaii, with the most expensive Vaio they could acquire. Sony refused, arguing Vaio's sales had just started to grow after years of difficulties.

Serlet spoke at WWDC 2006 on the perceived similarities between Mac OS X Tiger and Windows Vista, including comparing Apple's Aqua interface and Microsoft's Aero interface. He poked fun at the apparent visual similarities and referenced a 2004 WWDC banner that read, "Redmond, start your photocopiers" — a reference to Microsoft headquarters, which is located in Redmond, Washington. He also spoke at WWDC 2009 and gave an in-depth demonstration of Snow Leopard, which included further references to Microsoft's Windows operating system — claiming that Windows 7 is just another version of their widely criticized Vista release, citing the ongoing use of the Windows Registry, DLLs, the User Account Control (UAC) subsystem and existence of an interactive disk defragmenter.

On March 23, 2011, Apple announced that Serlet was leaving the company "to focus less on products and more on science."

Business Insider reported Serlet had founded a startup in cloud computing called Upthere along with other former Apple employees. In November, 2012, Upthere raised an undisclosed amount of venture capital funding from Kleiner Perkins Caufield & Byers, Elevation Partners, and Google Ventures. Upthere was acquired by Western Digital on August 28, 2017.

In July 2012 he joined the board of directors of Parallels, Inc.

In 2015, he co-founded data center technology company Fungible with former Juniper Networks' CEO Pradeep Sindhu.

In an interview with INRIA, he shared details about Grokable, a small stealth startup he is working on. According to Serlet, Grokable is "a purely scientific and highly innovative project that involves imitating animal intelligence."
