= E120 =

E120 most often refers to:

- Carmine, a food colourant with the E number E120
- Unbinilium, also known as element 120 or eka-radium, a predicted chemical element not yet observed

It may also refer to:

- E120 bomblet, a U.S. Cold War biological cluster bomb sub-munition
- The ICAO aircraft type designator for the Embraer EMB 120 Brasilia
- Juniper E-Series, Broadband Services Router
- KiHa E120, a Japanese train type
- Toyota Corolla (E120), a car
- Acer beTouch E120, a smartphone

== See also ==
- Azorubine (E122)
