= Bob Muglia =

American business executive (born 1959)

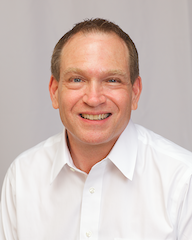
- Born: 1959 (age 66–67)
- Education: University of Michigan
- Occupation: CEO of Snowflake Computing
- Known for: Head of Servers and Tools division at Microsoft
- Website: Official profile

Bob Muglia (born 1959) is an American business executive and research and development specialist. He was formerly the Chief Executive Officer of Snowflake Computing, a data warehousing startup. Muglia is known for managing divisions at Microsoft that supported the Microsoft Office Suite, Windows Server and MSN Network product families. He was one of four presidents that reported directly to Microsoft CEO Steve Ballmer.

Muglia held several executive positions at Microsoft before resigning from the company in 2011. He worked briefly for Juniper Networks, then accepted his position as CEO of Snowflake Computing in June 2014.

== Early life ==
Bob Muglia was born in 1959 in Connecticut. His father was an automotive parts salesman. Muglia started working at his first job when he was 15 years old. He moved to Michigan and earned an undergraduate degree from the University of Michigan in 1981. After graduating, he started working for ROLM Corporation.

== Career ==
=== Microsoft ===
==== Windows and business software ====
Bob Muglia started his Microsoft career in 1988. He was the first product manager for SQL Server. Muglia also served as the director of Windows NT Program Management and User Education. He was promoted to vice president of the Windows NT division in October 1995. Muglia later held the position of vice president of the Server Application group, until he was promoted to senior vice president of the Applications and Tools group in February 1998.

Bob Muglia was influential in a corporate restructuring at Microsoft in 1999, which assigned business divisions to customer types, rather than technologies. As part of the re-structuring, Muglia became head of the business-productivity group, which oversaw Microsoft Office, Exchange and other business software. According to Computer Reseller News, Muglia pushed developers to visit customers, created customer advisory boards and led other efforts to incorporate customer input into product development at Microsoft.

Muglia testified in the United States v. Microsoft Corp. antitrust lawsuit, and in a case between Microsoft and Sun Microsystems regarding Microsoft's use of Java. According to New York Times reporters Steve Lohr and Koel Brinkley, the judge embarrassed Muglia by rebuking him for his persistent characterization of an email from Bill Gates. Muglia also negotiated aggressively with RealNetworks, regarding an antitrust dispute between the two companies.

In August 2000, Muglia was appointed to vice president of a new .NET Services Group. The following year he was reassigned to focus on database technologies as senior vice president of the Enterprise Storage Services Group. He helped develop Microsoft's plan for autonomic computing, which was announced in March 2003. By early 2004, Muglia held the position of senior vice president of the Windows Server Division.

==== Servers and tools division ====
Another re-organization at Microsoft in 2005 resulted in Muglia taking the position of Senior Vice President of Servers and Tools before being promoted to president of the division in 2009. This made Muglia one of four presidents at Microsoft.

During his tenure, the business group grew its revenues more than ten percent each year for six years. The division accounted for more than 20 percent of Microsoft's revenues by January 2009. In this position, Muglia led Microsoft's ten-year plan for data center and desktop automation products, its Dynamic Systems Initiative and its Dynamic IT strategy. In October 2010, developers criticized Muglia for suggesting Microsoft would put less emphasis on Silverlight; a statement he later retracted.

Muglia announced his resignation from Microsoft in January 2011; he was replaced by Satya Nadella, now Microsoft's CEO. He was the fourth executive reporting directly to Microsoft CEO Steve Ballmer to resign between early 2010 and 2011. According to Financial Times, Ballmer credited Muglia for growing the servers and tools division, but implied the departure was related to disagreements between the two executives about the company's cloud computing strategy.

=== Juniper ===
In July 2011, a few months prior to Muglia's last day at Microsoft, Juniper Networks announced it would hire Muglia as the executive vice president of its software division. He reported to then Juniper CEO Kevin Johnson, who (along with other Juniper staff) is also a former Microsoft executive. Muglia was hired to consolidate Juniper's software groups under a new division called Software Solutions. He also helped develop Juniper's software-defined networking (SDN) strategy.

In December 2013 Muglia quit Juniper, a month after Shaygan Kheradpir was appointed as the company's new CEO. Several other Juniper executives also left around this time.

=== Snowflake computing ===
Bob Muglia was Chief Executive Officer of Snowflake Computing, a cloud-based data-warehousing startup until April 2019. He joined the company in June 2014, a couple years after it was founded in 2012. Snowflake Computing came out of stealth mode that October.
