= Scott Kriens =

American businessman

- Education: California State University, East Bay
- Title: Chairman, Juniper Networks

Scott Kriens is an American businessman. He is chairman and former CEO of Juniper Networks.

== Early life and education ==
Kriens received his Bachelor of Arts in Economics from California State University, East Bay, in Hayward, California, in 1979. A collector of European sports cars, Kriens, as an undergraduate, had repaired cars to meet expenses.

== Career ==
Kriens began his marketing career with Burroughs Corporation, which merged with Sperry in 1986 to form Unisys, and then worked for Tandem Computers, before becoming a co-founder of telecommunications equipment company StrataCom, Inc. in 1986. From 1986 to 1996 Kriens was vice president of sales and operations, until Stratacom was acquired for $4.5 billion by Cisco.

Crosspoint Venture Partners subsequently recruited Kriens to lead Juniper Networks, naming him CEO in October 1996, where he remained until September 2008. Juniper's market success is largely credited to Kriens. Juniper's stock rose from $57 per share, at the start of 2000, to an all-time high of $243 per share, in mid-October 2000. In 2008, Kevin Johnson became CEO of Juniper, while Kriens remained as chairman.

Kriens was ranked 463rd on the Forbes Executive Pay in 2006, 478th in 2007 and 454th in 2008

He was the U.S. Winner of the EY Entrepreneur of The Year Award in 2000 with Juniper Networks

== 1440 Foundation and 1440 Multiversity ==
In 2010, Kriens, with his wife, Joanie, established the 1440 Foundation and the 1440 Multiversity retreat center in the redwoods of Scotts Valley, California.
