= Juniper EX-Series =

Series of Ethernet network switches

- Manufacturer: Juniper Networks
- Type: Network switch
- Processor: Internet processor
- Ports: LAN

Juniper EX-Series is a series of Ethernet network switches designed and manufactured by Juniper Networks. These switches run on Juniper's network operating system, JUNOS.

== Creation ==
The EX series was launched in 2008.

== Features ==
The EX switches support a range of features including high availability and network access control (NAC). The NAC support, which Juniper calls Unified Access Control (UAC), enables the switches to enforce access policies rather than rely on firewalls, VPN gateways, or switches made by other vendors.

Juniper Networks EX-series Ethernet switches are compliant with Internet protocol (IP) telephony solutions from Avaya. They are also interoperable with leading network management platforms from AlterPoint, CA, EMC, HP, IBM, InfoVista and SolarWinds.

Network World Lab Alliance certified that Juniper switches are a credible alternative for enterprise access in switching, compared to access switches of other vendors.
