= Fungible Inc. =

Technology company (2015–2023)

- Type: Private
- Industry: Data center technology
- Founded: 2015; 11 years ago
- Founders: Pradeep Sindhu; Bertrand Serlet
- Defunct: January 9, 2023
- Fate: Acquired by Microsoft
- Headquarters: Santa Clara, California, United States
- Key people: Pradeep Sindhu (Chairman); Eric Hayes (CEO)
- Number of employees: 200
- Website: fungible.com at the Wayback Machine (archived 2023-01-09)

Fungible Inc. was a technology company headquartered in Santa Clara, California. It developed hardware and software to improve the performance, reliability and economics of data centers.

== History ==
The company was founded in 2015 by Pradeep Sindhu, co-founder and chief scientist of Juniper Networks, and Bertrand Serlet, former senior vice president of software engineering at Apple Inc.

In February 2017, the company raised $32 million in a series A round, led by Mayfield Fund, Walden Riverwood Ventures and Battery Ventures.

In June 2019, the company raised $200 million (~$248 million in 2025) in a series C funding round, led by SoftBank Vision Fund, along with Norwest Venture Partners and existing investors. By then, the company had 200 employees.

In September 2019, Fungible announced the appointment of former Dell and IBM chief technical officer Dr. Jai Menon as its chief scientist.

In July 2021, Fungible announced the appointment of Eric Hayes replacing Pradeep Sindhu, as its CEO.

In January 2023, Microsoft announced the acquisition of Fungible to bolster its data center infrastructure and their data processing unit. Fungible stockholder and ex-employee Naveen Gupta filed a lawsuit against the company, seeking to "investigate potential wrongdoing and breaches of fiduciary duties."

== Products ==
Fungible developed a category of programmable microprocessors called data processing units (DPUs), designed to accelerate the processing of data-centric workloads within data centers. A DPU acts as a data traffic controller, shuttling traffic from the network to central processing units (CPUs), and graphics processing units (GPUs) from other chip makers. DPUs enable a high speed data center fabric between DPU-enabled compute and storage servers.

The microprocessors enable the next evolution of data center infrastructure known as composable disaggregated infrastructure, which is a way for data centers to improve their architecture by disassociating compute and storage elements, removing the physical limitations of existing servers. Data center resources can be pooled and aggregated dynamically over a high speed data fabric.
