= Unisphere Networks =

Defunct networking equipment manufacturer

- Type: Division
- Industry: Networking hardware
- Founded: 1999
- Founder: Siemens AG
- Defunct: 2002
- Fate: Acquired
- Headquarters: Westford, MA, United States
- Products: Network security, Workstations and Microprocessors
- Website: www.unispherenetworks.com (archived)

Unisphere Networks (formally Unisphere Solutions) was a Westford, Massachusetts-based networking equipment manufacturer and subsidiary of German corporation Siemens AG. Formed in 1998 at a cost of roughly US$1 billion, Unisphere was later sold to Juniper Networks in May 2002 for between $585 million and $740 million, as $375 million in cash and 36.5 million shares of Juniper stock.

Long known for their expertise in the circuit-switched realm of public-switched telephone networks (or PSTNs), Siemens embarked on a market strategy that held, as a primary goal, entry into the North American packet-switched market arena. Unisphere Solutions (changed to Unisphere Networks in late 2000) was an essential element of this strategy as it leveraged existing technology in, at the time, three critical and growing areas of the Internet: edge-networking/BRAS, voice mediation, and core routing.

Following the acquisition of Redstone Communications, CEO and founder James Dolce, joined the Unisphere management team and for a time reported to then Unisphere CEO Martin C. Clague. Dolce replaced Clague in January 2000 when the former was appointed as Unisphere's president and CEO.

== Companies/groups that composed Unisphere ==
=== Acquisitions ===
The following acquisitions made up the majority of Unisphere and were distinct BUs within the new company:

- Redstone Communications — Specialized in edge-routing and BRAS technology. Their flagship product, the ERX-series (later Juniper's E-series of routers, now EOL), competed against Cisco's 10000 and 7500 series routers as well as the Redback's SMS platform. The ERX was the main compelling reason why Juniper acquired Unisphere in 2002.
- Argon Networks — Specialized in core-routing technology meant to compete with Cisco's GSR and Juniper's M and T-series core routers. The Argon product never made it out of R&D and the project was cancelled following the Juniper acquisition.
- Castle Networks — Specialized in voice-mediation. The Castle Networks trunking gateway was widely deployed in internet offload applications as well as an intelligent gateway. Castle was absorbed by Siemens in May 2002.

=== Internal Siemens divisions ===
Two groups within Siemens Information Communication Networks were added to the above acquisitions to complete Unisphere Networks:

- Internet Solutions Business Unit based in Boca Raton, FL, whose softswitch design was based upon Siemens' Reliable Telco Platform (RTP). This application allowed the softswitch to be installed on a cluster of Sun Solaris-based servers with the goal being to add the resiliency required to achieve carrier-class "five-9s" reliability. Despite being fairly successful and deployed by a number of US-based carriers, voice mediation was never Juniper's core competency and this technology was sold back to Siemens in June 2002.
- The Siemens Telecom Innovation Centre based in Ottawa, Ontario, Canada which produced the SDX-3000 service and policy management products. Under Juniper, the SDX-3000 product line was renamed the SRC product line.

== IPO ==
Despite the tech bubble pop in April 2001, Unisphere did plan to launch their IPO in the 2002 timeframe. However, as management waited for favorable IPO conditions, the above-mentioned purchase by Juniper dashed any IPO plans.

== Legacy ==
The only products (original or evolved) still in production are Juniper's SRC product line (formerly the SDX-3000), Nokia Corporation softswitch application Servers hiQ8000 and hiQ4200 respectively, and Unify's OpenScape line (formerly the SRX-3000 and HiPath 8000). Juniper's ERX line was available for about 12 years after acquisition until it reached EOL (end-of-life) in 2014 with EOS (end-of-support) scheduled in the 2019 timeframe.

== See also ==
- List of acquisitions by Juniper Networks
