= E130 =

E130 may refer to:

- Indanthrene blue RS, a food additive
- KiHa E130 series, a Japanese train type
- Acer beTouch E130, a smartphone
