= ScreenOS =

Real-time operating system

- Developer: Juniper Networks
- Working state: Current
- Source model: Closed source
- Latest release: 6.3.0r27 / 23 April 2019; 7 years ago
- License: Proprietary
- Succeeded by: Junos OS (on later hardware)

ScreenOS is a real-time embedded operating system for the NetScreen range of hardware firewall devices from Juniper Networks.

== Features ==
Beside transport level security ScreenOS also integrates these flow management applications:

- IP gateway VPN management – ICSA-certified IPSec
- IP packet inspection (low level) for protection against TCP/IP attacks
- Virtualization for network segmentation

== Possible NSA backdoor and 2015 "Unauthorized Code" incident ==
In December 2015, Juniper Networks announced that it had found unauthorized code in ScreenOS that had been there since August 2012. The two backdoors it created would allow sophisticated hackers to control the firewall of un-patched Juniper Netscreen products and decrypt network traffic. At least one of the backdoors appeared likely to have been the effort of a governmental interest. There was speculation in the security field about whether it was the NSA. Many in the security industry praised Juniper for being transparent about the breach. WIRED speculated that the lack of details that were disclosed and the intentional use of a random number generator with known security flaws could suggest that it was planted intentionally.

== NSA and GCHQ ==
A 2011 leaked NSA document says that GCHQ had current exploit capability against the following ScreenOS devices: NS5gt, N25, NS50, NS500, NS204, NS208, NS5200, NS5000, SSG5, SSG20, SSG140, ISG 1000, ISG 2000. The exploit capabilities seem consistent with the program codenamed FEEDTROUGH.

== Versions ==
ScreenOS version	Release date	End of Support	End of life
6.3.0r27	23 April 2019		
6.0	19 April 2007	19 April 2010	19 April 2011
5.4	24 July 2006	24 July 2009	24 July 2010
5.3	24 October 2005	24 October 2008	24 October 2009
5.2	11 May 2005	11 May 2008	11 May 2009
5.1	22 October 2004	22 October 2007	22 October 2008
5.0	18 December 2003	18 December 2006	18 December 2007
4.0	1 August 2002	31 October 2006	31 October 2007
