= Pradeep Sindhu =

Indian-American business executive (born 1953)

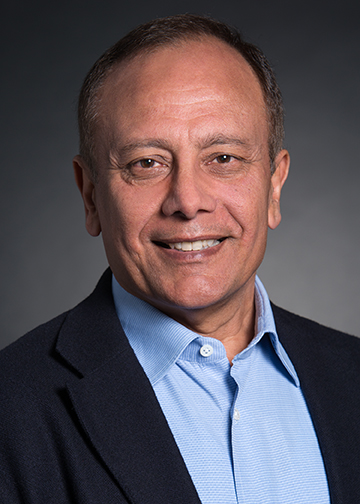
- Born: 4 September 1953 (age 72); Varanasi, India
- Citizenship: United States
- Education: IIT Kanpur; University of Hawaiʻi; Carnegie Mellon University
- Employer(s): Juniper Networks, Fungible Inc.
- Known for: Co-founder, Juniper Networks
- Title: Chief Scientist, Juniper Networks, CEO & Founder, Fungible

Pradeep Sindhu is an Indian-American business executive. He is the chairman, chief development officer (CDO) and co-founder of data center technology company Fungible. Previously, he co-founded Juniper Networks, where he was the chief scientist and CEO until 1996.

== Biography ==
Sindhu holds a B.Tech. in electrical engineering (1974) from the Indian Institute of Technology, Kanpur, M.S. in electrical engineering (1976) from the University of Hawaiʻi, and a PhD (1982) in computer science from Carnegie Mellon University where he studied under Bob Sproull.

== Work ==
Sindhu had worked at the Computer Science Lab of Xerox PARC for 11 years. Sindhu worked on design tools for very-large-scale integration (VLSI) of integrated circuits and high-speed interconnects for shared memory architecture multiprocessors.

Sindhu founded Juniper Networks along with Dennis Ferguson and Bjorn Liencres in February 1996 in California. The company was subsequently reincorporated in Delaware in March 1998 and went public on 25 June 1999.

Sindhu worked on the architecture, design, and development of the Juniper M40 data router.

Sindhu's earlier work at Xerox PARC influenced the architecture, design, and development of Sun Microsystems' first high-performance multiprocessor system family, which included systems such as the SPARCcenter 2000 and SPARCserver 1000.

Sindhu is the founder and CEO of data center technology company Fungible.
