= Transmode =

Swedish computer networking company

- Type: Public
- Traded as: NASDAQ OMX Stockholm: TRMO
- Industry: Telecommunications equipment
- Founded: 2000
- Headquarters: Stockholm, Sweden
- Key people: Tom Nyman (chairman of the board of directors), Karl Thedéen (CEO), Sten Nordell (chief technology officer)
- Products: packet-optical networking systems
- Revenue: SEK 1.01 billion (Jan-Dec 2012)
- Net profit: SEK 139.2 million (Jan-Dec 2012)
- Employees: 270
- Website: http://www.transmode.com/

Transmode, headquartered in Stockholm, Sweden, was a publicly listed provider of networking solutions, which enable fixed line and mobile network operators to cost effectively address the increasing capacity needs created.

== Foundation and mission ==
The company's solutions serve as important building blocks in next-generation high-speed optical networks that support services such as broadband backhaul, mobile data backhaul, video and cloud computing. Transmode focuses on providing solutions to customers in the metro networks segment, utilizing WDM technology and technology for packet optical transport. Since May 2011, Transmode (as Transmode Holding AB) is listed on the NASDAQ OMX Stockholm ticker identity TRMO.

== History ==
The company was formed in March 2005 when two Stockholm-based private telecoms companies, Transmode Systems and Lumentis, merged to address renewed worldwide demand for scalable and low-cost optical networking solutions. Transmode entered into the US market by winning a $1.5 million order from Stealth Communications for its NYC deployment.

In August 2015, Transmode was acquired by US corporation Infinera (following an offer made in April 2015), with shareholders receiving a mix of cash and Infinera shares, giving a total equity value for Transmode of about $350 million.
