= Acer beTouch E120 =

Smartphone manufactured by Acer Inc.

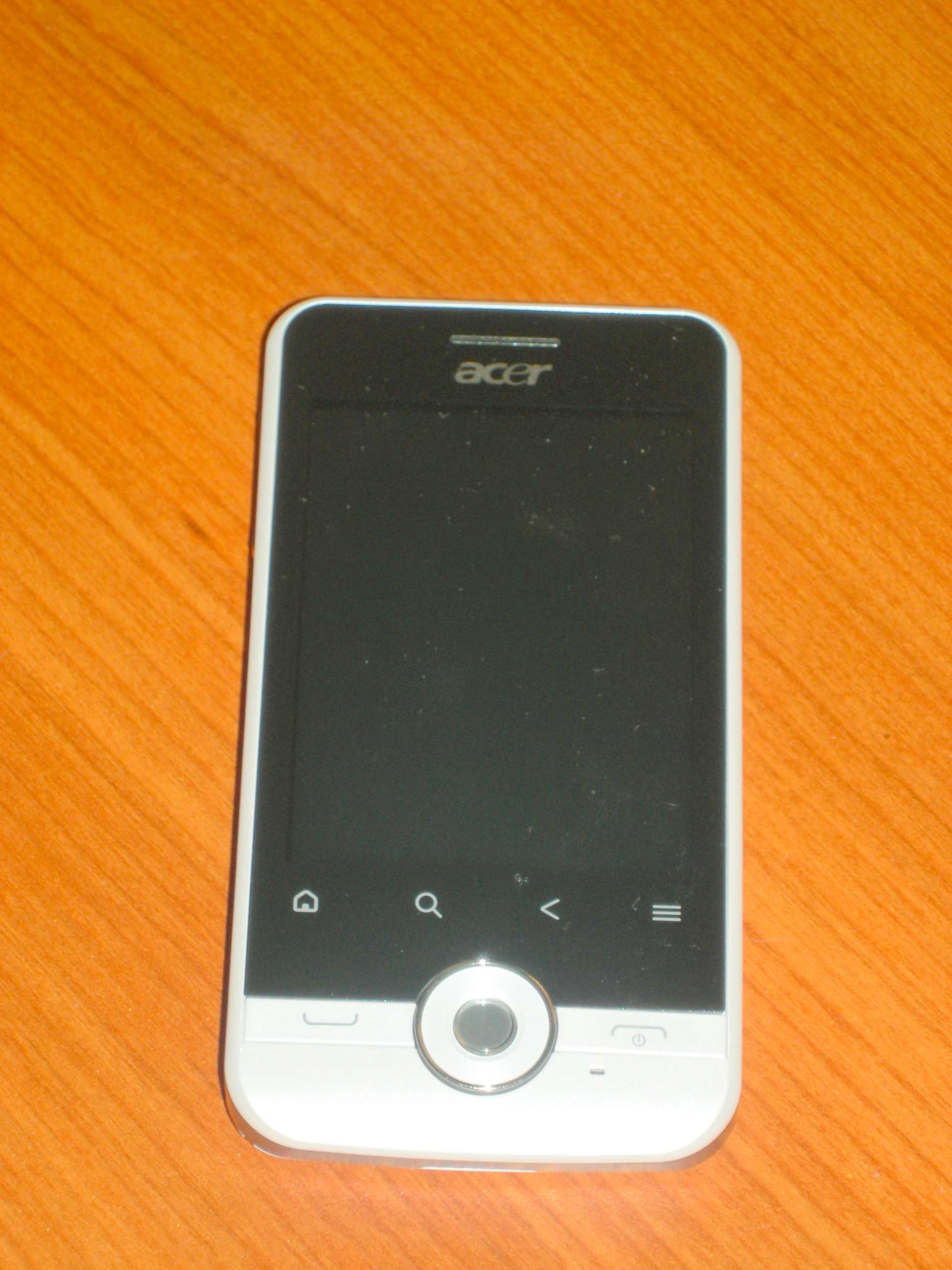
- Manufacturer: Acer Inc.
- Series: Acer beTouch
- First released: June 1, 2010
- Dimensions: 104.5×54×13.2 mm (4.11×2.13×0.52 in)
- Weight: 105 g (4 oz)
- Operating system: Android 1.6 "Donut"
- Memory: 256 MB RAM
- Rear camera: 3.2 megapixel
- Display: 240 x 320 pixelspx
- Connectivity: Wi-Fi, Bluetooth, ExtUSB, Micro-SD slot, Micro-USB
- Data inputs: 2.8” QVGA touch screen

The Acer beTouch E120 is an Internet-enabled smartphone by Acer Inc that uses Android 1.6 operating system. It was officially presented at Computex 2010 in Tapei and it looks very similar to Acer beTouch E130

== Main features ==
The Acer beTouch E120 is an Android phone running version 1.6 and it packs a 2.8-inch touchscreen, a 3.2 -megapixel camera, and the processor is powered by a ST Ericsson at 416 MHz. One of the main differences with the Acer beTouch E130 – is that the latter comes with a QWERTY keyboard . The smartphone includes WiFi, GPS, Bluetooth and radio.

== See also ==
- List of Android devices
- Galaxy Nexus
