= Infinera =

Manufacturer of optical fiber telecommunications equipment

Infinera (now part of Nokia)
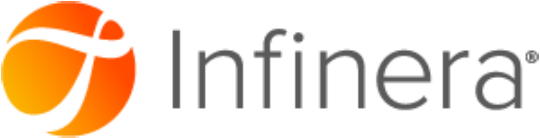
- Industry: Telecommunications
- Founded: 2000; 26 years ago (as Zepton Networks)
- Headquarters: San Jose, California, US
- Key people: David Heard (CEO)
- Products: Networking systems and products
- Website: nokia.com

Infinera Corporation was an American vertically integrated manufacturer of Wavelength-division multiplexing (WDM)-based packet optical transmission equipment based in San Jose, California. It was also a manufacturer for IP transport technologies, for the telecommunications service provider market. It was a pioneer in designing and manufacturing of large-scale photonic integrated circuits (PICs).

The company sold hardware and software networking options for Tier 1 carrier, Internet content provider, cable operator, government, and enterprise networks.

In June 2024, Nokia acquired Infinera for $2.3 billion.

== History ==
Infinera was founded in 2000 as Zepton Networks by Drew Perkins, Jagdeep Singh and David Welch.

It raised its first round of funding in April 2001. The startup remained in stealth mode until its first products were launched in 2004, although a few early media articles did describe the company's component technology - a photonic integrated circuit in indium phosphide.

Underwritten by Goldman Sachs, Infinera went public on Nasdaq in 2007, raising $182 million.

David Welch was recognized in 2013 with the JJ Thomson Medal for Electronics, an award from the Institution of Engineering and Technology for his role as a pioneer in the field of optical devices, including PICs, and optical networks.

On August 14, 2013, DANTE (Delivery of Advanced Networks to Europe, a research and education network) and Infinera announced that they had set a Guinness World Record by provisioning 8 terabits per second (Tb/s) of long-haul capacity on the GÉANT network from Vancis in Amsterdam, Netherlands to GlobalConnect in Hamburg, Germany in 19 minutes and 1 second using Infinera's DTN-X packet optical transport platform.

In August 2015, Infinera acquired Transmode, a supplier of metro packet-optical networking systems based in Stockholm, Sweden, following an offer made in April 2015. Transmode shareholders received a mix of cash and Infinera shares, giving a total equity value for Transmode of about $350 million.

On July 23, 2018 Coriant entered into a definitive agreement to be acquired by Infinera. This acquisition was closed on October 1, 2018.

Nokia acquired Infinera for $2.3 billion in a cash and stock deal in June 2024.

== Technology ==
Infinera pioneered the design and manufacturing of large-scale photonic integrated circuits. Over 2000 patents have been filed by Infinera in fields including optical transport and the virtualization of optical bandwidth.

The production efficiency of using monolithic integration with PIC has permitted Infinera to incorporate hundreds of advanced optical components into a small package to deliver capacity up to 800 gigabits per second (Gb/s) per wavelength.

This large throughput may be in excess of actual carrier requirements. Infinera has changed its business model to permit purchase of a 500 Gbit/s. line card by a carrier, but only switch on capacity in 100 Gb/second units of capacity. The company refers to this pricing model as "Cashflow-Efficient Instant Bandwidth" and has trademarked the term. The company's technology road map projects linecards' throughput to scale to 4 terabit and beyond.

== Business strategy ==
The company's business strategy has been based upon introducing of leading edge speeds, initially with 10 Gb/second, and as of 2013, 100 Gb/second and 500 Gb/second based upon Superchannels (or combining channels). These higher speed offerings are referred to as coherent super-channels. These higher level speeds are enabled by the use of photonic integrated circuits (PIC) which combine digital circuitry and photonic circuitry in a hybrid multi-layer (3-D) component.

Real time virtualization of bandwidth represents a relatively new capability in optical transport networks. Previously, engineers would have to physically reconfigure equipment to provide for reallocation of bandwidth to different customers channels or services. Provisioning is exceptionally fast with PIC and virtualization.

== Operations ==
As of July 2018, the company has its own fab in Sunnyvale, with component packaging occurring in Allentown, Pennsylvania, plus the former Transmode facility in Stockholm. For many of its products, Infinera designs and manufactures in-house the photonic integrated circuits (PICs), the ASIC chips, and the hardware and software systems, including operating and management systems and software-defined network (SDN) software to extend network virtualization into the optical layer. The company refers to its combined component development, product development and system manufacturing as vertically integrated.

The company announced in 2019, that it is moving its headquarters from Sunnyvale to San Jose. However, it plans to continue operating its fab from the Sunnyvale facility.

In 2026, the company purchased a manufacturing site in San Jose for $27 million.

== See also ==
- Generalized Multi-Protocol Label Switching (GMPLS)
- Optical transport network (OTN)
- Photonic integrated circuit
- Submarine communications cable
- Wavelength-division multiplexing
