= Kevin Johnson (American businessman) =

American businessman (born 1960)

- Born: October 9, 1960 (age 66); Gig Harbor, Washington, U.S.
- Education: New Mexico State University, Las Cruces (BA)
- Title: Director, Goldman Sachs; Former president and CEO of Starbucks
- Predecessor: Howard Schultz
- Successor: Howard Schultz (interim CEO) Laxman Narasimhan (CEO)

Kevin R. Johnson (born October 9, 1960) is an American businessman and software engineer who was the president and chief executive officer (CEO) of Starbucks Coffee Company from 2017 to 2022. Succeeding Howard Schultz as CEO, Johnson previously was the company's president and chief operating officer from 2015 to 2017. On March 16, 2022, Johnson announced that he was stepping down as CEO, Schultz would take over as CEO in the interim. Johnson joined the board of directors of Goldman Sachs in late 2022.

Born in Gig Harbor, Washington, Johnson was raised in Los Alamos, New Mexico. He graduated from New Mexico State University in 1981 before embarking on a career in software development. Johnson first worked as a systems engineer at IBM during the late-1980s, before moving to Microsoft in 1992 and was appointed to lead its worldwide sales, marketing and services in 2003. After one of his earliest clients, Starbucks, needed wireless internet in their stores, Johnson first met Schultz. Working closely with Microsoft CEO Steve Balmer and founder Bill Gates, Johnson was a member of the senior leadership team. Johnson left Microsoft during the 2008 financial crisis and was chief executive of Juniper Networks from September 2008 to January 2014.

Johnson first joined Starbucks in September 2009 as a board member after which Schultz asked him to take a greater role at the firm. He was subsequently appointed chief operating officer for two years before becoming chief executive. Under his tenure, Starbucks has streamlined its core business, managed corporate programs to address racial inequality in the U.S., and revamped its product suite horizontally, particularly in espresso machine manufacturing and technological innovation. Outside of his professional career, Johnson served under U.S. presidents George W. Bush and Barack Obama on the National Security Telecommunications Advisory Committee (NSTAC), a national cybersecurity task force.

== Early life and education ==
Born on October 9, 1960, in Gig Harbor, Washington, Johnson later moved to and was raised in Los Alamos, New Mexico, with his siblings. His mother, Carol, was a pediatric nurse at the Children's Clinic of Los Alamos, while his father Jim worked at Los Alamos National Laboratory as a theoretical physicist. Johnson graduated from Los Alamos High School in 1978. He went on to graduate from New Mexico State University (NMSU) in Las Cruces in 1981, with a B.A. in business administration. He received an honorary Doctor of Letters from NMSU in 2017.

== Career ==
=== IBM ===
Johnson began his career as a software engineer and became a systems engineer at IBM, in 1986, working in the company's systems integration and consulting business unit. At IBM he also worked as a software developer in the petroleum and financial services industries.

=== Microsoft ===
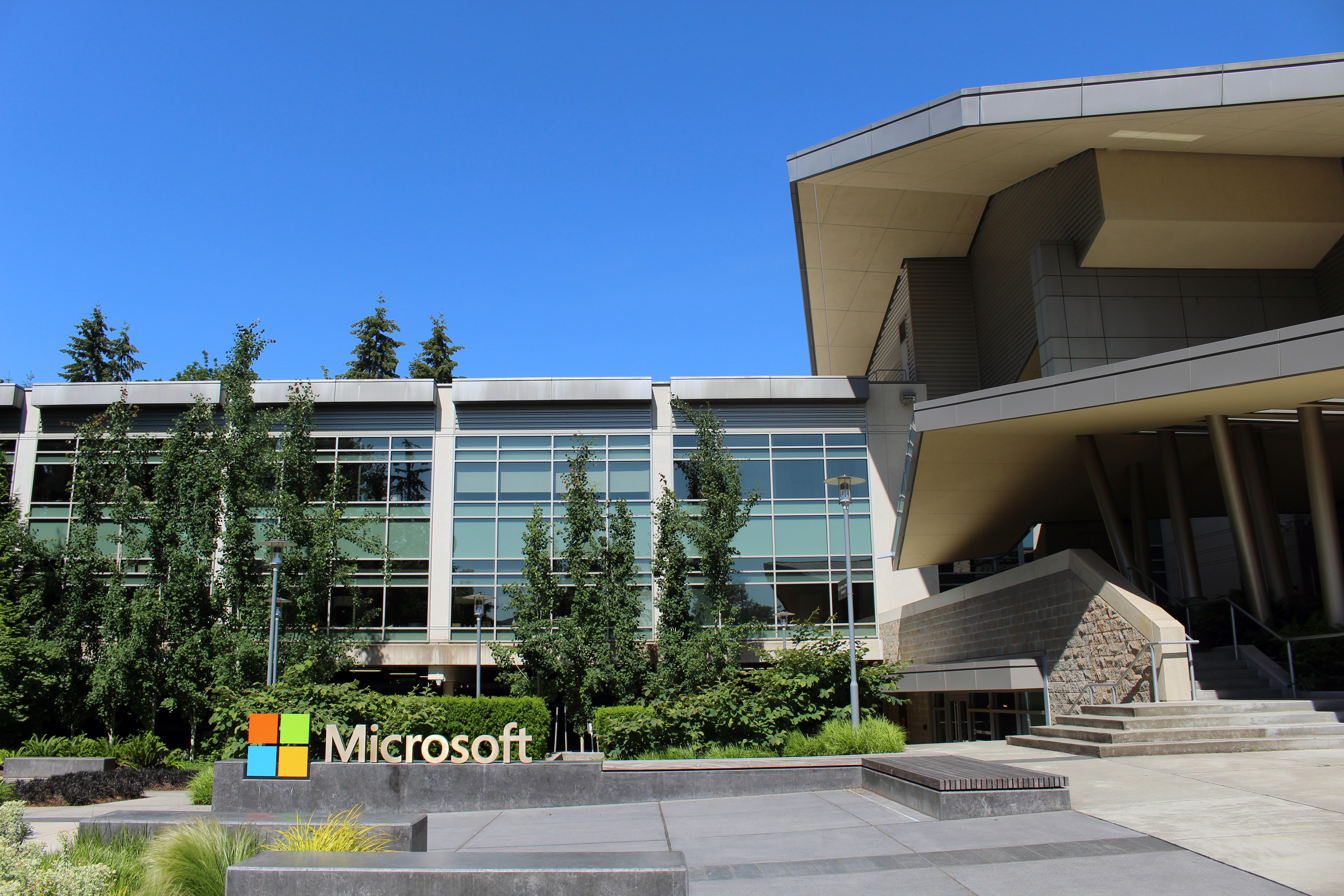
Johnson worked at Microsoft from 1992 to 2008.

Johnson joined Microsoft in 1992, working in global technical support and, later, sales and marketing. In 2001, he led the rollout of Microsoft wireless internet in Starbucks stores, which is when he met and began working with Starbucks founder Howard Schultz. In 2003, Johnson was appointed group vice president of Microsoft's worldwide sales, marketing and services group. As head of worldwide sales, the company's top sales post, he "re-engineered field sales and realigned subsidiary operations" in around 80 countries.

On September 30, 2005, he was appointed co-president of Microsoft's newly created Platforms division, assuming sole responsibility after co-president Jim Allchin retired in 2006, giving Johnson responsibility over Windows Live, Windows operating systems, online advertising, search functions, servers, tools, and MSN online. Johnson oversaw $20 billion out of Microsoft's $56 billion in revenue, spearheading its "revamped online search and advertising strategy," regarded as crucial to competing with Google's online search tools. In 2006, Fortune named Johnson fourth on a list of "Rising Stars" in the technology industry. On the Senior Leadership Team, he became one of six executives along with Steve Ballmer and Bill Gates who oversaw strategy for Microsoft. Overseeing the release of Windows Vista in 2006 and 2007, in 2007 Johnson led Microsoft's acquisition of the online advertising company aQuantive for $6 billion. In 2008, he was a key figure in negotiations between Yahoo and Microsoft, with Microsoft ultimately withdrawing an acquisition offer. He resigned from Microsoft in July 2008. In a statement announcing his departure from Microsoft, Steve Ballmer, CEO, Microsoft, praised Johnson's contribution to the company.

=== Juniper ===
In September 2008, Johnson became CEO of Juniper Networks, in Sunnyvale, California.

In July 2013, Juniper Networks announced that Johnson would step down as CEO and planned to retire. He continued as CEO while a search for a new CEO was conducted. In January 2014, he was succeeded as Juniper CEO by Shaygan Kheradpir.

=== Starbucks ===
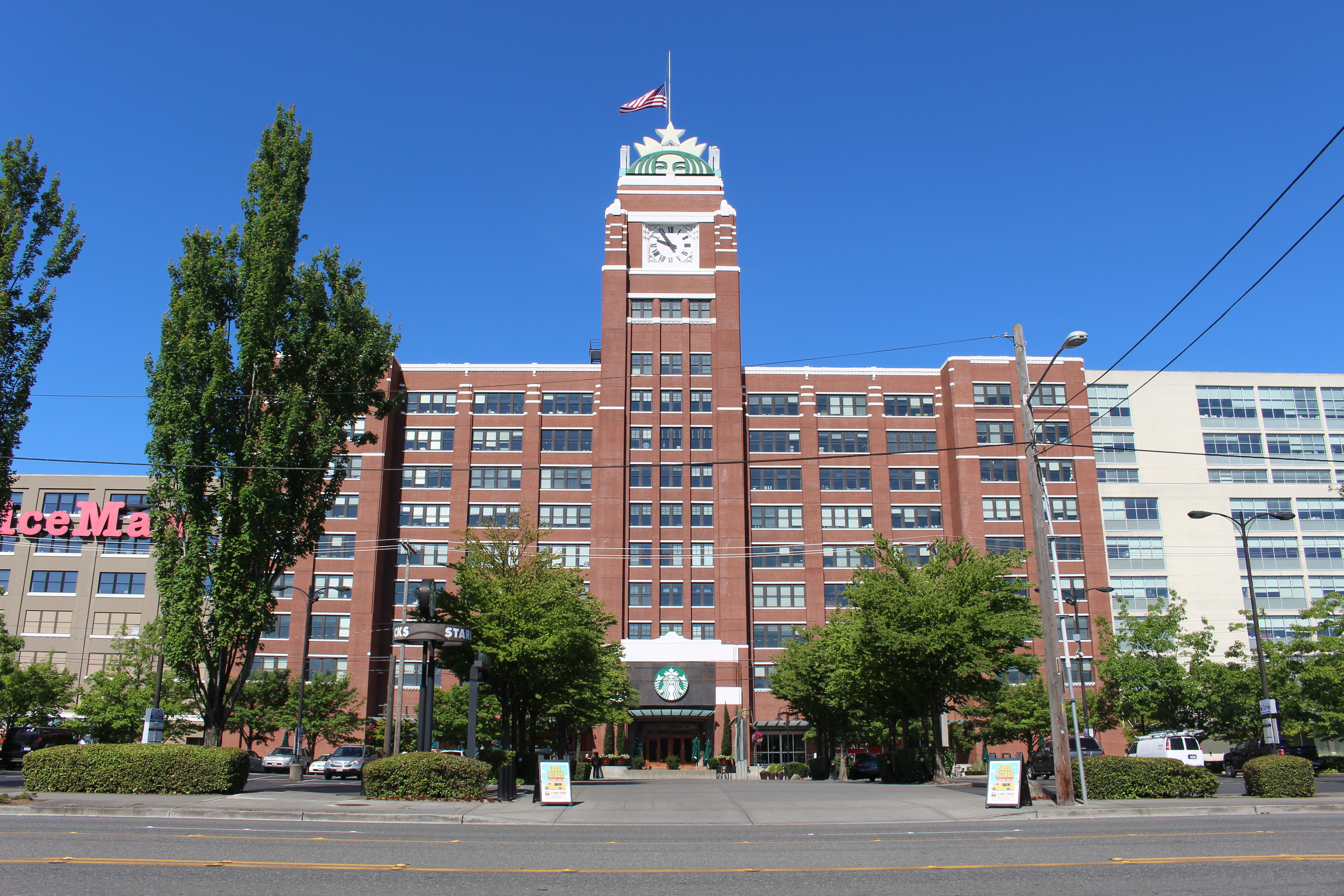
First joining Starbucks in 2009, Johnson served as president and COO from 2015 to 2017. Following the resignation of Howard Schultz, Johnson was appointed his successor; he served as CEO from 2017 to 2022.

Johnson became president and COO of Starbucks in March 2015, remaining on its board. He had oversight of global operations, including the supply chain and technology supporting 21,000 stores in 66 countries. He also oversaw online platforms and worked with Schultz on a five-year strategic plan for the company, released in December 2016. In December 2016 it was announced that Howard Schultz would step down as CEO of Starbucks, and in April 2017 that he had personally recruited Johnson to be his successor. On April 3, 2017, Johnson became the fourth CEO in Starbucks history, also remaining president. By 2018, he had implemented a number of changes, including the rollout of mobile ordering and pickup, and a global distribution deal with Nestle. For $7.15 billion, Nestle agreed to market Starbucks products outside of Starbucks stores in countries such as the US and China, as well as use Starbucks coffee in Nespresso and Nescafe products. Under Johnson, Starbucks acquired 100% of its East China joint venture for $1.3 billion. He also closed Teavana stores and the e-commerce unit, and sold Tazo to Unilever for $384 million. Analyst commentary on his first year was mixed. While he received criticism for weak sales in the United States, he was praised by CNBC for growth in China and well received by Bloomberg and The New York Times. Media also credited Johnson with a 15% stock value increase between 2017 and November 2018, noted as "not far from an all-time high." In 2017, advocates petitioned him to include baristas in Starbucks paid parental leave policy, and Johnson announced an expanded policy in 2018.

In May 2018, two Black men, who were waiting for a business associate to arrive, were arrested for trespassing in a Philadelphia Starbucks, resulting in public protests and accusations of racial profiling. Describing the incident as "reprehensible" and apologizing personally on Good Morning America, Johnson met with the victims and the Philadelphia police commissioner to arrange a settlement. Johnson was "widely praised" then for also closing all United States stores for racial-bias training. and mandating anti-bias training for management and new hires.

In 2018, Johnson opened the Tryer Center, a Seattle research laboratory, to test new product and equipment ideas. Under Johnson, in 2018 and 2019, the company began developing biodegradable lids, straws, and cups, and partnered with UberEATS and Alibaba to deliver in the United States and China. The Financial Times reported, in 2018, that "colleagues credit [Johnson's] tech background with helping Starbucks outpace other retailers in mobile ordering and payments." He was named one of Seattle's Most Influential People of 2018 by Seattle Magazine for partnering Starbucks and Mary's Place, along with other initiatives to support homeless families.

In January 2019, it was reported that Johnson was scaling down several of Schultz's initiatives from two years prior, including testing of Starbucks Reserve Roastery cafes. According to The Wall Street Journal, that "discipline" had also resulted in slowed store growth in the United States, and that Johnson was "working to improve customer service, pushing the company to develop more innovative beverages and expanding its reach in China." Under Johnson, Starbucks shares had risen 79% by August 2019, and Johnson pledged to return $25 billion to shareholders by 2020. Johnson supports raising the federal minimum wage, announcing in 2021 that the company would mark its 50th anniversary in 2022 by increasing wages to a minimum of $15 per hour for all U.S. employees. Other than during the COVID-19 pandemic, company sales increased annually during his tenure. Johnson informed Starbucks in early 2021 that he was considering retirement as the pandemic wound down. In March 2022, the company announced that he would retire as CEO and as a director that April, continuing as an advisor through September.

=== The North Star Project ===
Johnson’s first major initiative was the 2017 two-year North Star project that aimed to refocus Starbucks’ approach to customer service. However, employees reported that Starbucks was forcing baristas to take responsibility for customer-service problems caused by other issues like understaffed stores, an increasing demand from mobile and drive-thru orders, and time-intensive drinks. Essentially, they were ordered to find a way to improve the customer experience — or quit the company.

=== Compensation ===
In March 2021, Starbucks shareholders voted down Johnson’s compensation proposal, following the advice of the Institutional Shareholder Services (ISS) and fellow proxy-advisor firm Glass Lewis, which may indicate some shareholders think the chief executive is overpaid.

The proposal included a one-time bonus award of $1.86 million for the 2020 fiscal year. The reason for the rejection of the proposal was that Starbucks hadn’t explained adequately why the long-term award is made in cash and that the frequency of the one-time awards is concerning. Glass Lewis also recommended the vote against because Starbucks "paid [its CEO] moderately more than its peers, but performed worse".

Even though the down-vote is non-binding, shareholders ultimately decided to go with the recommendation and voted down Johnson's proposed compensation package. In late 2019, Starbucks' board had also had also agreed to provide Johnson with a three-year retention bonus of up to $50 million. Between 2017 and 2019, he received $44.1 million in total compensation.

== Government and advisory roles ==
In 2008, Johnson was appointed by George W. Bush to the National Security Telecommunications Advisory Committee (NSTAC), where he served under Bush and Barack Obama. As chairman of the cybersecurity committee, he was tasked with proposing methods to deal with a cyber security attack.

He has been an advisor to Catalyst, an organization dedicated to women's career advancement. In October 2022, Johnson joined the board of directors of Goldman Sachs.

== Personal life ==
Johnson and his wife, June, have two sons and reside in Washington. Around 2012 Johnson temporarily retired from business to focus on his health, having been previously diagnosed with a treatable cancer. Johnson is active in basketball, boating, golfing, skiing, and hiking. A sports fan, Johnson cites writings by basketball coach John Wooden as a personal influence. He and his family practice Transcendental Meditation daily.

== See also ==
- List of chief executive officers
- List of New Mexico State University alumni
- Development of Windows Vista
