= Coriant =

Telecommunications company

- Type: Telecommunications
- Industry: Telecom
- Founded: 2013; 13 years ago
- Headquarters: Munich and Naperville, Germany and United States
- Area served: Worldwide
- Key people: Pat DiPietro (CEO); Reza Ghaffari (COO); Homayoun Razavi (CCO); Bala Ganesan (CFO); Uwe Fischer (CTO)
- Products: Intelligent Network Management, Integrated Optical Planning Solutions, Packet Optical Transport Solutions, MSPP Solutions, Edge Routing Solutions, Cross-Connect/TDM Solutions, Optical LAN & Broadband Access
- Revenue: unknown
- Operating income: unknown
- Number of employees: about 3000
- Parent: Infinera
- Website: www.coriant.com

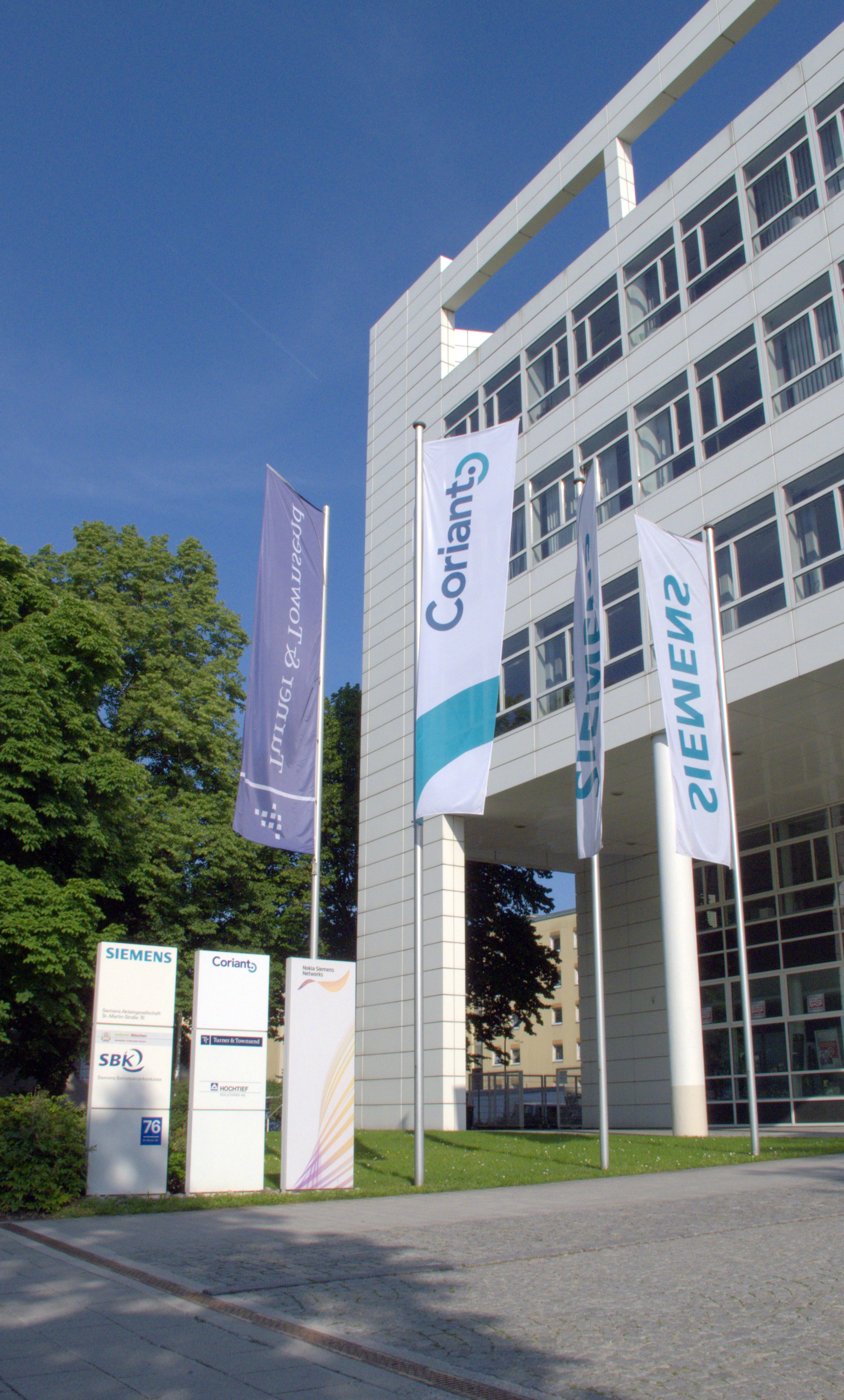
Munich: Campus St. Martin St. - North Entrance

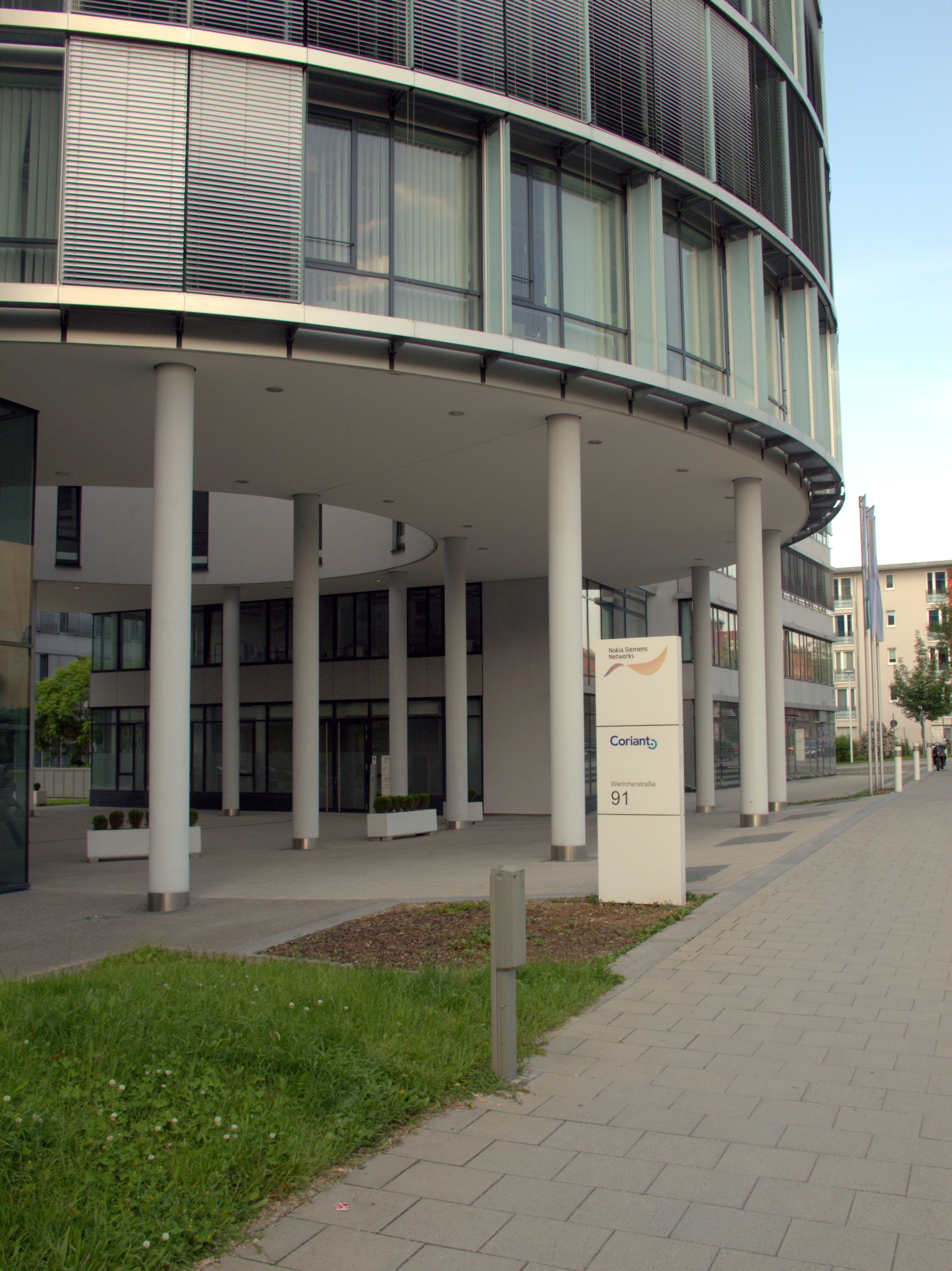
Munich: Campus St. Martin St. - South Entrance (Werinher St.91)

Coriant was incorporated as an independent company in 2013 as a spin-out from Siemens Optical Networks (NSN ON). The launch of the company was announced for the OFC/NFOEC in March 2013 and on May 6, 2013 Coriant became independent from Nokia Siemens Networks under the ownership of Marlin Equity Partners.

Coriant merged with Sycamore Networks (acquired by Marlin Equity in January 2013 and headquartered in Chelmsford, Massachusetts), which continued operating as Coriant America Inc.

Marlin Equity merged Coriant and Tellabs (acquired by Marlin Equity in December 2013 Naperville, Illinois), which continued as Coriant. Later, the telco and GPON related components of the company were spun back out as a new company, also called Tellabs.

Coriant was acquired by Infinera in 2018.

== History ==
Coriant originates from the Transmission Technology department of Siemens based in Munich, Germany (Übertragungstechnik - ÜT as it was called in the 1990s). In those days the technology evolved from Plesiochronous Digital Hierarchy (PDH) to Synchronous Digital Hierarchy (SDH) in the STM-4 / STM-16 (2.5 Gbit/s) level.

In the late 1990s and early 2000s DWDM emerged to allow for even higher transmission capacity (in the terabit per second region). This technology is also named optical transport network (OTN), where a set of multiplex and encapsulation hierarchies is standardized.
