= List of acquisitions by Juniper Networks =

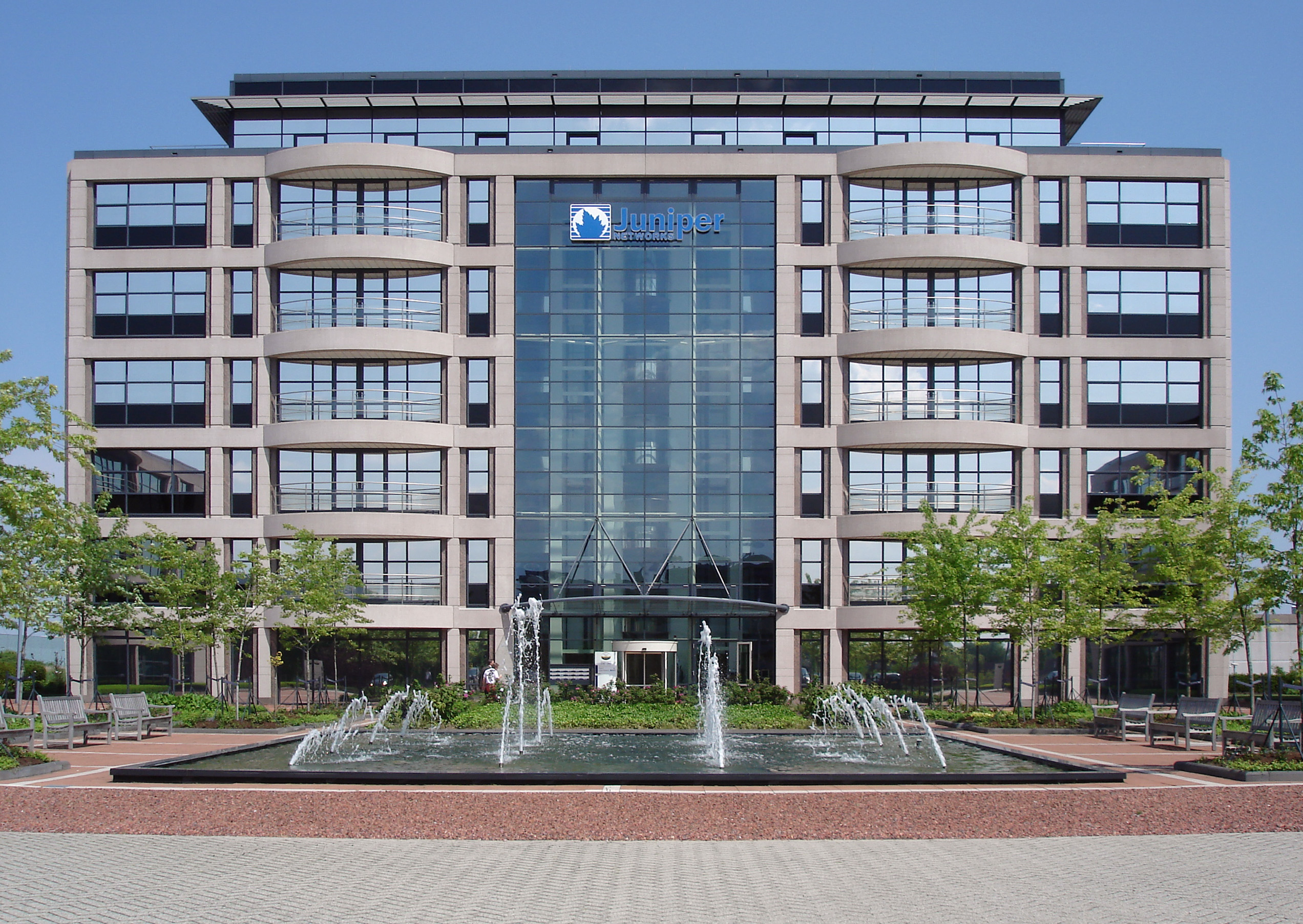
Juniper Networks campus in Amsterdam

Juniper Networks, Inc. was an information technology and computer networking products multinational company, founded in 1996.

By 2001, Juniper had made only a few acquisitions of smaller companies, due to the leadership's preference for organic growth. The pace of acquisition picked up in 2001 and 2002 with the purchases of Pacific Broadband and Unisphere Networks. In 2004 Juniper made a $4 billion acquisition of network security company NetScreen Technologies. Juniper revised NetScreen's channel program that year and used its reseller network to bring other products to market.

Juniper made five acquisitions in 2005, mostly of startups with deal values ranging from $8.7 to $337 million. It acquired application-acceleration vendor Redline Networks, VOIP company Kagoor Networks, as well as wide area network (WAN) company Peribit Networks. Peribit and Redline were incorporated into a new application products group and their technology was integrated into Juniper's infranet framework.

From 2010 to September 2011, Juniper made six acquisitions and invested in eight companies. Often Juniper acquired early-stage startups, developing their technology, than selling it to pre-existing Juniper clients. Juniper acquired two digital video companies, Ankeena Networks and Blackwave Inc., as well as wireless LAN software company Trapeze Networks. In 2012, Juniper acquired Mykonos Software, which develops security software intended to deceive hackers already within the network perimeter. and a developer of software-defined network controllers, Contrail Systems. In 2014 Juniper acquired the software-defined networking (SDN) company WANDL.

Juniper Networks itself was acquired by Hewlett Packard Enterprise in July 2025. Following the acquisition, Juniper was absorbed into HPE Networking.

== Acquisitions ==
| | Date | Company | Business | Country | Value (USD) | Adjusted (USD) | References |
|---|---|---|---|---|---|---|---|
| 1 | November 15, 1999 | Layer Five, Palo Alto, CA. Founded : 1997 | Intellectual property development and licensing | United States | 19,000,000 | 37,000,000 | |
| 2 | January 18, 2000 | Pacific Advantage Ltd (PAL), Hong Kong. Founded : 1994 | Sales and marketing organization | Hong Kong | $4 million in stock | $7.5 million | |
| 3 | December 11, 2000 | Micro Magic Inc., Sunnyvale, CA. Founded : 1995 | ASIC design firm | United States | $260 million in stock and cash | $486.1 million in stock and cash | |
| 4 | November 12, 2001 | Pacific Broadband Communications, San Jose, CA. Founded : 1999 | CMTS and broadband solutions | United States | 200,000,000 | 364,000,000 | |
| 5 | July 2, 2002 | Unisphere Networks, Westford, MA, a subsidiary of Siemens. Founded : 1999 | Networking equipment manufacturer, Edge routers | United States | $585 million, which includes $375 million in cash and 36.5 million shares | $1047.2 million, which includes $671.3 million in cash and 65.3 million shares | |
| 6 | April 16, 2004 | NetScreen Technologies, Sunnyvale, CA. Founded: 1997 | Network security and access solutions and appliances. | United States | 4,000,000,000 | 6.818×10^{9} | |
| 7 | May 2, 2005 | Kagoor Networks, San Mateo, CA. Founded: 2000 | Provider of session border control (SBC) products for VoIP networking | United States | 65,700,000 | 108,000,000 | |
| 8 | July 6, 2005 | Peribit Networks, Santa Clara, CA. Founded: 2000 | Wide Area Network (WAN) optimization technology | United States | $337 million in cash, stock and assumed stock options. | $555.5 million in cash, stock and assumed stock options. | |
| 9 | May 2, 2005 | Redline Networks, Campbell, CA. Founded : 2000 | Development of Application Front End (AFE) technology. | United States | $132 million in cash and assumed stock options. | $217.6 million in cash, stock and assumed stock options. | |
| 10 | October 25, 2005 | Acorn Packet Solutions, Mc Lean, VA. Founded : 2002 | Time Division Multiplexing (TDM) and other circuit-based applications across next-generation IP networks. | United States | $8.7 million | $14.3 million | |
| 11 | November 14, 2005 | Funk Software, Cambridge, MA. Founded : 1982 | Network access security solutions | United States | $122 million | $201.1 million | |
| 12 | April 8, 2010 | Ankeena Networks, Santa Clara, CA. Founded : 2008 | New media infrastructure technology | United States | $100 million | $147.6 million | |
| 13 | November 8, 2010 | Blackwave Networks, Acton, MA. Founded : 2008 | Video Storage and delivery | United States | Undisclosed | Undisclosed | |
| 14 | November 16, 2010 | Trapeze Networks, Pleasanton, California; Founded : 2002 | WLAN systems and management software | United States | $152 million | $224.4 million | |
| 15 | December 6, 2010 | Altor Networks, Redwood Shores, California; Founded : 2007 | Virtual network security | United States | $95 million | $140.3 million | |
| 16 | February 21, 2011 | Brilliant Telecommunications, Campbell, CA; Founded: 2004 | Synchronization technology | United States | $4.5 million | $6.4 million | |
| 17 | February 22, 2012 | Mykonos Software, San Francisco CA; Founded : 2009 | Intrusion Deception Systems | United States | $80 million | $112.2 million | |
| 18 | December 12, 2012 | Contrail Systems, Santa Clara, CA. Founded: 2012 | Software-defined network controllers | United States | $176 million | $246.8 million | |
| 19 | February 3, 2013 | Webscreen Systems, Bracknell UK; Founded : 2002 | dDoS | United Kingdom | $10 million | $13.8 million | |
| 20 | December 16, 2013 | WANDL, Piscataway NJ; Founded : 1986 | Network software solutions for design, planning and operations | United States | $60 million | $82.9 million | |
| 21 | January 2016 | BTI Systems, Kanata, ON, Canada Founded: 2000 | DWDM and Optical Transmission | Canada | not disclosed | not disclosed | |
| 22 | December 1, 2016 | Appformix | Cloud operations management and optimization technology | United States | $47.9 million | $64.3 million | |
| 23 | September 2, 2017 | Cyphort | Security analytics for advanced threat defense | United States | not disclosed | not disclosed | |
| 24 | November 29, 2018 | HTBASE | Software-Defined Enterprise Multicloud | Canada | not disclosed | not disclosed | |
| 25 | March 4, 2019 | Mist Systems | AI Driven WLAN | United States | $405 million | $510 million | |
| 26 | September 28, 2020 | Netrounds | Intent-Based Networking and Automated Closed Loop Assurance | United States | not disclosed | not disclosed | |
| 27 | October 19, 2020 | 128 Technology | Accelerating the Industry Transformation from Network-Centric SD-WANs to User-Centric AI-Driven WANs | United States | $450 million | $559.8 million | |
| 28 | December 7, 2020 | Apstra | Intent-Based Networking for Data Center Networks | United States | not disclosed | not disclosed | |

=== Acquisitions summary ===
Juniper Networks, Inc. has made 22 acquisitions, although it has not taken stake in any companies. Juniper made 1 divestiture in 2006.

| Year | Acquisitions | Stakes | Divestitures |
|---|---|---|---|
| 2019 | 1 | 0 | 0 |
| 2018 | 1 | 0 | 0 |
| 2017 | 1 | 0 | 0 |
| 2013 | 2 | 0 | 0 |
| 2012 | 2 | 0 | 0 |
| 2011 | 1 | 0 | 0 |
| 2010 | 3 | 0 | 0 |
| 2009 | 0 | 0 | 0 |
| 2008 | 0 | 0 | 0 |
| 2007 | 0 | 0 | 0 |
| 2006 | 0 | 0 | 1 |
| 2005 | 5 | 0 | 0 |
| 2004 | 1 | 0 | 0 |
| 2003 | 0 | 0 | 0 |
| 2002 | 1 | 0 | 0 |
| 2001 | 1 | 0 | 0 |
| 2000 | 2 | 0 | 0 |
| 1999 | 1 | 0 | 0 |
| Total | 22 | 0 | 1 |
