= Juniper M series =

Line of multiservice edge routers

- Date invented: 1998
- Manufacturer: Juniper Networks
- Type: Network router
- Processor: Internet processor

Juniper M series is a line of multiservice edge routers designed and manufactured by Juniper Networks, for enterprise and service provider networks. It spans over M7i, M10i, M40e, M120, and M320 platforms with 5 Gbit/s up to 160 Gbit/s of full-duplex throughput. The M40 router was the first product by Juniper Networks, which was released in 1998. The M-series routers run on JUNOS Operating System.

== Models and platforms ==
The M-series platform of Juniper routers includes the models like M7i, M10i, M40e, M120, and M320 routers. M40 and M20 platform routers have reached the end of sale.

=== M40 ===
M40 was the first product by Juniper Networks, which was released in 1998. The M40 was the first of its kind capable of scaling to meet the internet standards, which can move 40 million packets per second with a throughput rate in excess of 20 Gbit/s full-duplex. With the initial offering of m40, Juniper came up with the Internet Processor I. The proprietary ASIC was the fundamental core of Juniper's Packet Forwarding Engine (PFE). The PFE consisted of a shared memory, a single forwarding table, and a one-write, one-read architecture. The entire PFE was capable of forwarding at 40 Mpps, a capacity more than 100 times faster than that of any other available router architectures at that time. The M40 is one of the first routers on this scale, about 10 times faster than Cisco's 12000.

The M series was also the first in the industry to offer a true decoupling of the control plane and the forwarding plane.

=== M20 ===
M20 was the second router introduced by Juniper Networks which was released in December 1999. The M20 also uses the Internet Processor II ASIC and is capable of throughput in excess of 10 Gbit/s full-duplex. The M20 was the first Juniper router available with redundancy (power supply, routing engine, and system and switch board [SSB] ).

=== M160 ===
The M160 router, which was introduced in March 2000 as the third box in the M series from Juniper Networks, outperforms its contemporary peers in areas of BGP table capacity, MPLS LSP capacity, route flapping recovery at OC-192 speeds, convergence at both OC-192 and OC-48 speeds, and filtering at both OC-192 and OC-48 speeds. In additional tests, the M160 has matched or exceeded the competition in the areas of CoS at OC-48 and OC-192 speeds and IP and MPLS baseline testing at OC-48 and OC-192 speeds.

Unfortunately the M160 unexpectedly turned out to cause packet reordering especially on OC192 interfaces, because the packets are forwarded using four Packet Forwarding Engines operating in parallel. Packet reordering may affect the performance of transport protocol and applications.

=== M5 and M10 ===
They were introduced at the same time in September 2000, because they had similar architectures with two different throughput capabilities (5Mpps and 2.5 Gbit/s on the M5, 10Mpps and 5 Gbit/s on the M10). Both routers employs the Internet Processor II ASIC, providing forwarding table lookups at 40Mpps. There are two forwarding engine boards (FEBs) in the M10, allowing for a maximum of eight physical interface cards (PICs) to be used.

=== M40e ===
The M40e platform was introduced in February 2002. The M40e router has the same port density as the M40, but it provides the optional redundancy that the M40 didn't have. This model is compatible with most of the PICs from the M20, M40, and M160 models.

=== M7i ===
The M7i router is Juniper Networks most compact routing platform. The M7i is suited to the role of an IP/MPLS provider edge router in small POPs or as an enterprise routing solution for Internet gateway or branch aggregation. It supports either two fixed Fast Ethernet ports, two fixed Gigabit Ethernet ports, or one fixed Gigabit Ethernet port via a Fixed Interface Card (FIC), as well as supporting four ejector-enabled PICs. The M7i router supports interface speeds of up to OC-12c/STM-4 and Gigabit Ethernet.

=== M10i ===
The M10i router is a compact and fully redundant M-series edge router. The M10i supports 8 ejector-enabled PICs via two built-in Flexible PIC concentrators, and interface speeds up to OC-12/STM-4 and Gigabit Ethernet.

=== M120 ===
The M120 delivers support for 128 Gigabit Ethernet subscriber ports, with 10 Gigabit Ethernet or OC 192 uplink capabilities. It is capable of supporting MPLS services at Layers 2 and 3, including Layer 3 VPNs. The M120 is designed to deliver superior redundancy and facilitate the transport of legacy Frame Relay and ATM traffic over high-bandwidth Ethernet links.

=== M320 ===
The M320 is a high performance, 10 Gbit/s-capable, distributed architecture edge router. It offers up to 16 OC-192c/STM-64 PICs per chassis (32 per rack) or up to 64 OC-48c/STM-16 ports per chassis (128 per rack), with up to 320 Gbit/s throughput. It also supports provider edge services in 10-gigabit POPs with the ability to support up to 32 type 1 and type 2 PICs and up to 16 type-3 PICs for 10 Gbit/s uplinks. PICs are compatible with M40e, M120, T320, and T640.

=== Comparison ===
Platform	M7i	M10i	M40e	M120	M320
Aggregate half-duplex throughput	10 Gbit/s	16 Gbit/s	51.2 Gbit/s	120 Gbit/s	320 Gbit/s
Aggregate full-duplex throughput	5 Gbit/s	8 Gbit/s	25.6 Gbit/s	60 Gbit/s	160 Gbit/s
FPC slots	1 built-in	2 built-in	8 FPC slots	4 FPC slots 2 cFPC slots	8 FPC slots
Full-duplex throughput per slot	4 Gbit/s additional 1 Gbit/s for FIC	4 Gbit/s	3.2 Gbit/s	10 Gbit/s	20 Gbit/s
10-gigabit Ethernet density	0	0	0	6	16
PICs per chassis	4 plus 2 additional fixed FE, or 1 fixed GE ports	8	32	16	32
Chassis per rack	24	9	2	4	2
Redundancy	No	Yes	Yes	Yes	Yes

The Juniper M-series products are widely used in the large networks around the world.

== Features ==
Features and services supported in M Series routers include advanced IP/MPLS edge routing services, a broad array of VPNs, network-based security, real-time voice and video, bandwidth on demand, rich multicast of premium content, IPv6 services, granular accounting etc. These IP/MPLS M Series Multiservice Edge Routing platforms are deployed at the edge of provider networks, in small and medium cores, and in peering, route reflector and data-center applications.

A single M-series multiservice edge routing platform can provide a single point of edge aggregation for thousands of customers over any access type — including ATM, Frame Relay, Ethernet and TDM and at any speed from DS0 up to OC-192/STM-64 and 10 Gigabit Ethernet.

It also supports Layer 2 virtual circuits, Layer 2 VPNs, Layer 2.5 Interworking VPNs, Layer 3 2547 VPNs, VPLS, IPSec, GRE, IP over IP and other tunneling mechanisms.

It supports multiple levels of granular quality of service per port, per logical circuit (DLCI, VC/VP, VLAN), and per channel (to DS0) for traffic prioritization. These comprehensive QoS functions include classification, rate limiting, shaping, weighted round-robin scheduling, strict priority queuing, weighted random early detection, random early detection and packet marking. For network convergence applications, Layer 2 CoS can be mapped to Layer 3 CoS on a per DLCI, per VP/VC, or per-VLAN basis.
