= Shaygan Kheradpir =

American businessman (born 1960)

- Born: December 19, 1960 (age 65); London, United Kingdom
- Citizenship: American
- Education: PhD in electrical engineering
- Alma mater: Cornell University
- Occupation: Business and technology executive
- Known for: Former CEO of Juniper Networks and Coriant
- Website: shaygankheradpir.com

Shaygan Kheradpir (Persian: شایگان خردپیر; born December 19, 1960) is an American business and technology executive. He held senior executive positions at GTE, Verizon, Barclays, and Juniper Networks, where he led various product development, operational and innovation initiatives, and was chairman and CEO of Coriant.

== Early life and education ==
Shaygan Kheradpir was born in London and grew up in Iran where his father was one of the pioneers of Otolaryngology in the country. After attending Aiglon College for high school, Kheradpir moved to the United States, earning a bachelor's, master's and doctoral degree in electrical engineering from Cornell University where he developed one of the early control algorithms for obstacle avoidance of autonomous robots.

== Career ==
=== Early work ===
Kheradpir's first job was at GTE Laboratories in 1987. There he worked on network routing, management, and control and patented a real-time algorithm. He eventually became chief information officer at GTE Corporation, "earning respect for delivering new products on schedule," according to The Wall Street Journal.

=== Verizon ===
In 2000, GTE merged with Bell Atlantic to form Verizon Communications. Kheradpir initially served as the president of Verizon's e-business division, before becoming the company's first CIO/CTO. At Verizon, Kheradpir contributed to the company's diversification into a broader range of telecommunications products & services, as well as the automation of operations.

In 2001, Kheradpir formed small teams that were each responsible for coming up with and developing new products. Kheradpir implemented a 30-day prototype cycle to rapidly test and modify new technologies in development. His team of approximately 10,000 staff often worked late hours, but positions at Verizon were in high demand, because of the department's rapid pace. According to InfoWorld, he led technology development for strategic initiatives such as FiOS (United States' largest fiber to the premises initiative at the time), process and systems transformation, and many new customer-facing products." In 2003 his team created iobi, which manages address books, caller ID and other features across devices over the internet. The Verizon One, a combination phone, router, modem and smart portable device, was developed from his department the following year. In 2010 they unveiled live TV on the first generation iPad streamed via FiOS TV as a cloud service. In the process he generated a number of product patents for internet-based multi-media communication services. His division also reengineered many of Verizon's core network system, including call center, website, automated customer service systems, and integrated formerly separate systems from predecessor companies GTE, Bell Atlantic and NYNEX.

During Kheradpir's tenure at Verizon, the company reduced its information technology budget from six percent of revenue (the industry average) to four percent. From 2000 to 2003, he reduced IT staff by 20 percent and reduced purchasing from technology vendors by 30 percent. He negotiated with vendors to reduce prices and lobbied Verizon to eliminate its policy against purchasing IT equipment being auctioned on eBay by failed dot-com businesses. He globalized many contract programming positions through creation of Verizon's own software development group in India called VDSI which grew to a multi-thousand force. Additionally, new software was installed that improved Verizon's utilization of IT hardware.

=== Barclays ===
In January 2011, Kheradpir joined Barclays as the chief operating officer of the Global Retail & Business Bank, where he oversaw technology innovations such as Pingit mobile payments platform and app with associated patent, the use of iPads to improve customer service in bank branches, introduction of state-of-the-art unified systems and "big data" at the bank and overall digitization of the bank. In March 2013, Kheradpir was promoted to Chief Operations and Technology Officer of the Barclays Group, leading the bank operations, technology functions, and the strategic transformation initiatives across retail, corporate, card and investment banking sectors. It was the first time a technology executive sat on the executive team at Barclays. Under his leadership Digitally Active customers for retail business grew by 19%, mobile banking customers by 56%, payments by 21% and digital unsecured lending doubled from 2013 to 2014. According to Financial Times, his departure from Barclays was viewed as "a blow to the bank and undermining the turnaround efforts vital to adopting to a tougher banking environment characterized by tougher regulation and challenging business environment".

=== Juniper Networks ===
Kheradpir became CEO of Juniper Networks in January 2014. He developed and executed a restructuring and cost-cutting plan that Juniper called its Integrated Operating Plan (IOP), in response to pressure from activist investors at Elliot Management. The plan included consolidation of product and R&D groups, putting a major emphasis on the market segments of Web 2.0, Cloud-Builder & High-IQ Networks, $160 million in structural cost cuts and returning $3 billion to shareholders over three years by buying shares and increasing dividends. According to Network World, Elliot Management was pleased with the plan. Kheradpir resigned from Juniper in November 2014 due to a disagreement with the board during a customer negotiation.

=== Coriant ===
In September 2015, Kheradpir was announced as the Chairman & CEO of Coriant. During his tenure at Coriant he revamped the company and its product portfolio for the new age of Telecom. Coriant's new product portfolio focused on open architectures fit for 5G, super high speed clouds with disruptive cost-per-bit economics via hyperscale packet-optical and routing architectures. In May 2018 Coriant announced in a public statement that Kheradpir was stepping down to pursue other opportunities and re-appointed Pat DiPietro as CEO. Just two months later in July 2018 Infinera announced it was buying Coriant for $430M. Kheradpir publicly thanked Coriant employees for being a "much needed disruptive force in the networking industry".

== Other activities ==
From 2010 to 2013, Kheradpir served on a board of the United States National Institute of Standards and Technology (NIST), known as the Visiting Committee on Advanced Technology. From 2007 to 2010, Kheradpir served on the advisory board of the YMCA of Greater New York. Kheradpir is a member of the Cornell University Engineering Council and on the board of MTN Group, a telecom service provider with 230 million subscribers globally. He was inducted into CIO Hall of fame in 2007.
