= Acer beTouch E130 =

Smartphone manufactured by Acer Inc.

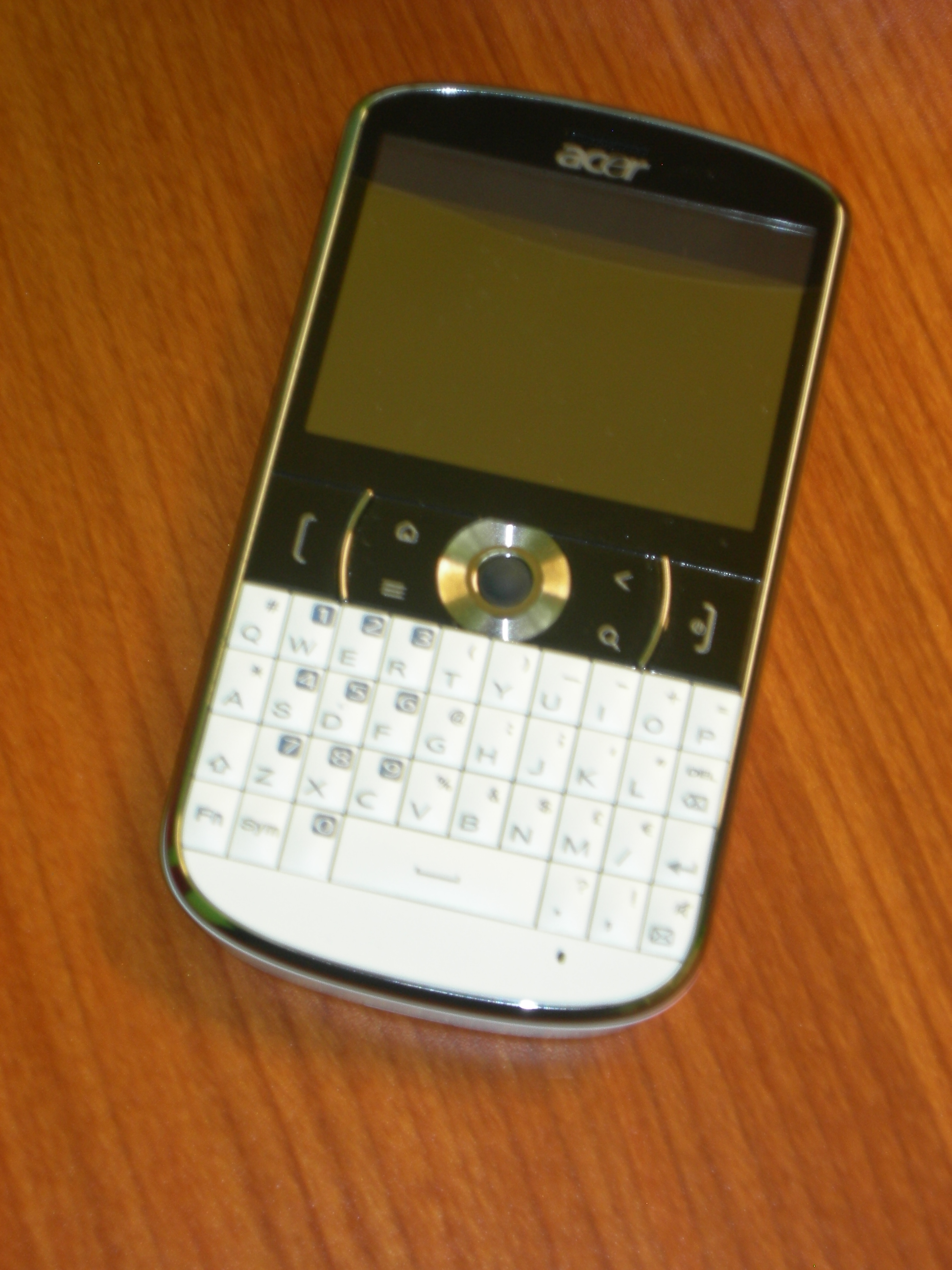
- Manufacturer: Acer Inc.
- Operating system: Android 1.6 "Donut" or Android 2.1 "Eclair" in later releases
- CPU: ST-Ericsson PNX6715, 416MHz
- Memory: 512/25 MB RAM/ROM
- Rear camera: 3.2 megapixel
- Display: LCD 2.6” QVGA touchscreen
- Connectivity: Wi-Fi (802.11b/g), Bluetooth 2.0+EDR, GPS built A-GPS, AGPS support, FM receiver, 3.5mm stereo audio jack

The Acer beTouch E130 is a smartphone manufactured by Acer Inc. using the Android 1.6 (Donut) operating system at launch and Android 2.1 in later releases and is designed for a professional use. It has a QWERTY keyboard. It was unveiled in June 2010 and available for sale from August 2010.

== Software ==
The beTouch E130 runs the Android operating system 1.6 (Donut). Several applications that come installed on this device are:

- Gmail
- Google Talk
- Google Maps
- Google Talk
- Google Street View
- YouTube video player

The device comes equipped with Acer Spinlet's application for listening to music in streaming and preinstalled Facebook and Twidroid.

== Hardware ==
- Display: LCD 2.6” QVGA touchscreen
- CPU: ST-Ericsson PNX6715, 416 MHz
- Keyboard: QWERTY
- OS: Android 1.6 (Donut) or Android 2.1
- Camera: 3.2 megapixel
- Connectivity: Wi-Fi (802.11b/g), Bluetooth 2.0+EDR, GPS built A-GPS, AGPS support, FM receiver, 3.5mm stereo audio jack
- Colors: black, white, a rare purple version debuted in October 2010
- Dimensions = 115 x 62.5 x 11.5 mm
- Weight = 109 g

== Reception ==
Reviews from newspapers and blogs underline its similarity to BlackBerry.

== See also ==
- Galaxy Nexus
- List of Android devices
