= Juniper Networks =

American multinational technology company

Juniper Networks, Inc.

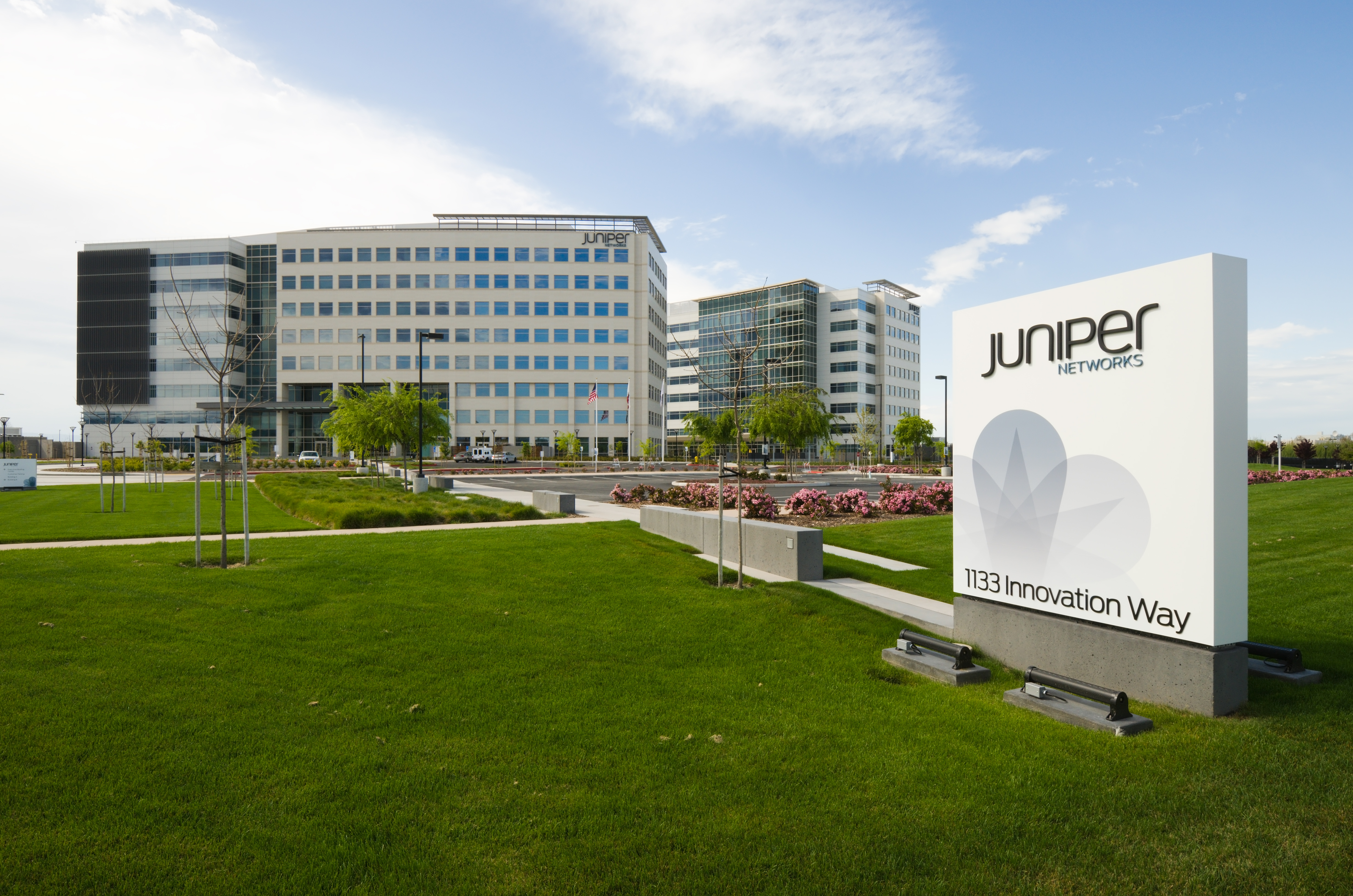
- Juniper's headquarters in Sunnyvale
- Traded as: NYSE: JNPR
- Industry: Networking hardware
- Founded: February 6, 1996; 30 years ago
- Founder: Pradeep Sindhu
- Defunct: July 2, 2025; 16 months ago
- Fate: Acquired by Hewlett Packard Enterprise
- Successor: HPE Networking
- Headquarters: Sunnyvale, California, United States
- Key people: Scott Kriens (chairman); Pradeep Sindhu (vice chairman); Rami Rahim (CEO)
- Revenue: ▼US$5.07 billion (2024)
- Operating income: ▼US$292 million (2024)
- Net income: ▼US$288 million (2024)
- Total assets: ▲US$10.0 billion (2024)
- Total equity: ▲US$4.78 billion (2024)
- Number of employees: 11,271 (2024)
- Website: juniper.net

Juniper Networks, Inc., was an American multinational corporation headquartered in Sunnyvale, California. The company developed and marketed networking products, including routers, switches, network management software, network security products, and software-defined networking technology.

The company was founded in 1996 by Pradeep Sindhu, with Scott Kriens as the first CEO, who remained until September 2008. Kriens has been credited with much of Juniper's early market success. It received several rounds of funding from venture capitalists and telecommunications companies before going public in 1999. Juniper grew to $673 million in annual revenues by 2000. By 2001 it had a 37% share of the core routers market, challenging Cisco's once-dominant market-share. It grew to US$4 billion in revenues by 2004 and $4.63 billion in 2014. Juniper appointed Kevin Johnson as CEO in 2008, Shaygan Kheradpir in 2013 and Rami Rahim in 2014.

Juniper Networks originally focused on core routers, which are used by internet service providers (ISPs) to perform IP address lookups and direct internet traffic. Through the acquisition of Unisphere, in 2002, the company entered the market for edge routers, which are used by ISPs to route internet traffic to individual consumers. In 2003, Juniper entered the IT security market with its own JProtect security toolkit before acquiring security company NetScreen Technologies the following year. In the early 2000s, Juniper entered the enterprise segment, which accounted for one-third of its revenues by 2005. From 2014 to 2025, Juniper was focused on developing new software-defined networking products.

In January 2024, Juniper agreed to be acquired in full by Hewlett Packard Enterprise (HPE) for approximately $14 billion. The acquisition closed on July 2, 2025. It was later reported in 2026 that HPE worked with a conservative fixer to have anti-trust regulators in the US Department of Justice fired for not giving approval to the merger.

== History ==
=== Origins and funding ===
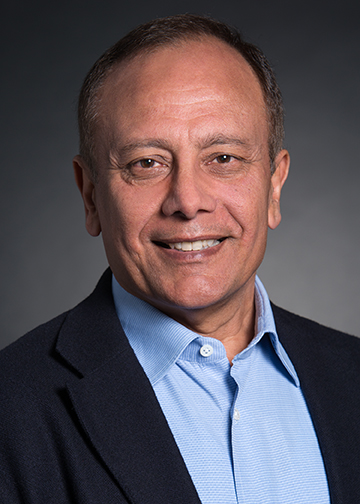
Juniper founder Pradeep Sindhu

Pradeep Sindhu, a scientist with Xerox's Palo Alto Research Center (PARC), conceived the idea for Juniper Networks while on vacation in 1995 and founded the company in February 1996. Sindhu wanted to create data packet-based routers that were optimized for Internet traffic (packet switching), whereby the routing and transferring of data occurs "by means of addressed packets so that a channel is occupied during the transmission of the packet only, and upon completion of the transmission the channel is made available for the transfer of other traffic." He was joined by engineers Bjorn Liencres from Sun Microsystems and Dennis Ferguson from MCI Communications.

Sindhu started Juniper Networks with $2 million in seed funding, which was followed by $12 million in funding in the company's first year of operations. About seven months after the company's founding, Scott Kriens was appointed CEO to manage the business, while founder Sindhu became the Chief Technology Officer. By February 1997, Juniper had raised $8 million in venture funding. Later that year, Juniper Networks raised an additional $40 million in investments from a round that included four out of five of the largest telecommunications equipment manufacturers: Siemens, Ericsson, Nortel and 3Com. Juniper also received $2.5 million from Qwest and other investments from AT&T.

=== Growth and IPO ===
Juniper Networks had $3.8 million in annual revenue in 1998. By the following year, its only product, the M40 router, was being used by 50 telecommunications companies. Juniper Networks signed agreements with Alcatel and Ericsson to distribute the M40 internationally. A European headquarters was established in the United Kingdom and an Asia-Pacific headquarters in Hong Kong. A subsidiary was created in Japan and offices were established in Korea in 1999. Juniper Networks's market share for core routers grew from 6% in 1998 to 17.5% one year later, and 20% by April 2000.

Juniper Networks filed for an initial public offering in April 1999 and its first day on the NASDAQ was that June. The stock set a record in first-day trading in the technology sector by increasing 191% to a market capitalization of $4.9 billion. According to Telephony, Juniper Networks became the "latest darling of Wall Street", reaching a $7 billion valuation by late July. Within a year, the company's stock grew five-fold.

Juniper Networks's revenues grew 600% in 2000 to $673 million. That same year, Juniper Networks moved its headquarters from Mountain View to Sunnyvale, California.

=== Competition ===
By 2001, Juniper controlled one-third of the market for high-end core routers, mostly at the expense of Cisco Systems sales. According to Businessweek, "analysts unanimously agree[d] that Juniper's boxes [were] technically superior to Cisco's because the hardware does most of the data processing. Cisco routers still relied on software, which often results in slower speeds." However, Cisco provided a broader range of services and support and had an entrenched market position. The press often depicted Juniper and Cisco as a "David versus Goliath" story. Cisco had grown through acquisitions to be a large generalist vendor for routing equipment in homes, businesses and for ISPs, whereas Juniper was thought of as the "anti-Cisco" for being a small company with a narrow focus.

In January 2001, Cisco introduced a suite of router products that Businessweek said was intended to challenge Juniper's increasing market-share. According to Businessweek, Juniper's top-end router was four times as fast at only twice the cost of comparable Cisco products. Cisco's routers were not expected to erode Juniper's growing share of the market, but other companies such as Lucent, Alcatel, and startups Avici Systems and Pluris had announced plans to release products that would out-pace Juniper's routers.

Juniper introduced a suite of routers for the network edge that allowed it to compete with Cisco. Juniper's edge routers had a 9% market share two months after release. Both companies made exaggerated marketing claims; Juniper promoted its products as stable enough to make IT staff bored and Cisco announced lab tests from Light Reading proved its products were superior to Juniper, whereas the publication itself reached the opposite conclusion. By 2002, both companies were repeatedly announcing products with faster specifications than the other in what Network World called a "'speeds-and-feeds' public relations contest".

By 2004, Juniper controlled 38% of the core router market. By 2007, it had a 5%, 18% and 30% share of the market for enterprise, edge and core routers respectively. Alcatel-Lucent was unsuccessful in challenging Juniper in the core router market but continued competing with Juniper in edge routers along with Cisco.

=== Further development ===
Logo as of 2001

In late 2000, Juniper formed a joint venture with Ericsson to develop and market network switches for internet traffic on mobile devices, and with Nortel for fiber optic technology. In 2001, Juniper introduced a technical certification program and was involved in the first optical internet network in China. Juniper's growth slowed in 2001 as the telecommunications sector experienced a slowdown and revenues fell by two-thirds during the dot-com bust. 9 to 10% of its workforce was laid off.

Juniper had rebounded by 2004, surpassing $1 billion in revenues for the first time that year and reaching $2 billion in revenue in 2005. Beginning in 2004, with the acquisition of NetScreen, Juniper Networks began developing and marketing products for the enterprise segment. Juniper had a reputation for serving ISPs, not enterprises, which it was trying to change. By 2005, enterprise customers accounted for one-third of the company's revenues, but it had spent $5 billion in acquisitions and R&D for the enterprise market.

In 2006, more than 200 US companies restated their financial results due to a series of investigations into stock backdating practices. Juniper stockholders alleged the company engaged in deceptive backdating practices that benefited its top executives unfairly. In December 2006, Juniper restated its financials, charging $900 million in expenses to correct backdated stock options from 1999 to 2003. This was followed by a $169 million settlement with stockholders in February 2010.

=== 2008–2025 ===
In July 2008, Juniper's first CEO, Scott Kriens, became chairman and former Microsoft executive Kevin Johnson was appointed CEO. Johnson focused the company more on software, creating a software solutions division headed by a former Microsoft colleague, Bob Muglia. Juniper also hired other former Microsoft executives to focus on the company's software strategy and encourage developers to create software products that run on the Junos operating system. Juniper established partnerships with IBM, Microsoft and Oracle for software compatibility efforts. The SSL/VPN Pulse product family was launched in 2010, then later spun off to a private equity firm in 2014 for $250 million.

In 2012, Juniper laid off 5% of its staff and four of its high-ranking executives departed. The following year, CEO Kevin Johnson announced he was retiring once a replacement was found. In November 2013, Juniper Networks announced that Shaygan Kheradpir would be appointed as the new CEO. He started the position in January 2014.

In January 2014, hedge fund, activist investor and Juniper shareholder Elliott Associates advocated that Juniper reduce its cash reserves and cut costs, before Kheradpir was officially appointed. That February, Juniper reached an agreement with Elliott and other stakeholders for an Integrated Operating Plan (IOP) that involved repurchasing $2 billion in shares, reducing operating expenses by $160 million and appointing two new directors to its board. That April, 6% of the company's staff were laid off to cut expenses. In November 2014, Kheradpir unexpectedly resigned following a review by Juniper's board of directors regarding his conduct in a negotiation with an unnamed Juniper customer. An internal Juniper executive, Rami Rahim, took his place as CEO.

In May 2014, Palo Alto Networks agreed to pay a $175 million settlement for allegedly infringing on Juniper's patents for application firewalls.

In 2015, Wired magazine reported that the company announced it had found unauthorized code that enabled backdoors into its ScreenOS products. The code was patched with updates from the company.

=== Acquisition by Hewlett Packard Enterprise ===
In January 2024, the company agreed to be purchased by Hewlett Packard Enterprise (HPE) for $14 billion in an all-cash deal to boost HPE's networking and artificial intelligence resources. The acquisition was contested by the U.S. Department of Justice (DOJ) in January 2025, citing concerns about reduced competition and innovation, leading to higher prices for consumers. Following a settlement with the DOJ, in which HPE agreed to divest its Instant On wireless division and license the source code for Juniper's Mist AI (a key component of Juniper's WLAN products), the acquisition was completed on July 2, 2025. Following the acquisition, Juniper was absorbed into HPE Networking, with Raimi named the new head of this division. HPE will continue to market Juniper's former product line under the HPE Juniper Networking brand. Later that month, Axios reported that the U.S. Intelligence Community had earlier directly intervened to persuade DOJ to allow the acquisition, arguing that blocking the merger would have harmed U.S. companies and strengthened Chinese competitors—particularly Huawei—framing the decision as critical to national security.

== Acquisitions and investments ==
By 2001, Juniper had made only a few acquisitions of smaller companies, due to the leadership's preference for organic growth. The pace of acquisition picked up in 2001 and 2002 with the purchases of Pacific Broadband and Unisphere Networks. In 2004 Juniper made a $4 billion acquisition of network security company NetScreen Technologies. Juniper revised NetScreen's channel program that year and used its reseller network to bring other products to market.

Juniper made five acquisitions in 2005, mostly of startups with deal values ranging from $8.7 to $337 million. It acquired application-acceleration vendor Redline Networks, VOIP company Kagoor Networks, as well as wide area network (WAN) company Peribit Networks. Peribit and Redline were incorporated into a new application products group and their technology was integrated into Juniper's infranet framework. Afterwards, Juniper did not make any additional acquisitions until 2010.

From 2010 to September 2011, Juniper made six acquisitions and invested in eight companies. Often Juniper acquired early-stage startups, developing their technology, then selling it to pre-existing Juniper clients. Juniper acquired two digital video companies, Ankeena Networks and Blackwave Inc., as well as wireless LAN software company Trapeze Networks. In 2012, Juniper acquired Mykonos Software, which develops security software intended to deceive hackers already within the network perimeter. and a developer of software-defined network controllers, Contrail Systems. In 2014, Juniper acquired the software-defined networking (SDN) company WANDL.

In April 2016, Juniper closed its acquisition of BTI, a provider of cloud and metro network technology, in an effort to beef up its data center interconnect and metro packet optical transport technology and services. Juniper acquired cloud operations management and optimization startup AppFormix in December 2016. In 2017, Juniper bought Cyphort, a Silicon Valley startup that makes security analytics software. Juniper acquired cloud storage company HTBASE in November 2018. In April 2019, Juniper acquired wireless LAN (WLAN) startup Mist Systems to bolster its software-defined enterprise portfolio and multicloud offerings. In February 2022, it was announced Juniper had acquired WiteSand, a specialist cloud-native zero trust network access control (NAC) solutions company.

== Products ==
Juniper Networks designed and marketed IT networking products, such as routers, switches and IT security products. It started out selling core routers for ISPs, and expanded into edge routers, data centers, wireless networking, networking for branch offices and other access and aggregation devices.

Prior to its acquisition by HPE, Juniper was the third largest market-share holder overall for routers and switches used by ISPs. According to analyst firm Dell'Oro Group, it was the fourth largest for edge routers and second for core routers with 25% of the core market. It was also the second largest market share holder for firewall products with a 24.8% share of the firewall market. In data center security appliances, Juniper was the second-place market-share holder behind Cisco. Juniper provides technical support and services through the J-Care program.

As of February 2020, Juniper's product families included the following:

Technology	Product families
Routing	T-series: Multichassis IP/MPLS Core Routers; MX Series: Edge routers; M Series: Combined IP/MPLS edge routers; PTX Series: Packet transport routers; ACX Series: Universal access routers
Switching	EX Series: Enterprise Ethernet switches; WLAN Products: Controllers, access points and software; QFX Series: Datacenter switches
Security	SRX Series: Security products for data centers and branch locations
Software	Junos Operating System; Junos Space: Service Oriented Architecture development environment for network applications; Contrail: Brand of software defined networking software and networking controllers; Marvis: Mist's AI Network Assistant that is also compatible with Juniper's switches through its Wired Assurance feature.
WLAN	AP41: The most popular enterprise-grade Access Point available through Mist. Tailored for WiFi, BLE, and IoT.; AP43: An upgraded AP41 with WiFi 6; AP61: A long-range access point ideal for outdoor use like college campuses

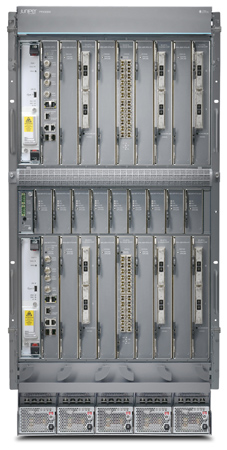
PTX3000 packet transport router

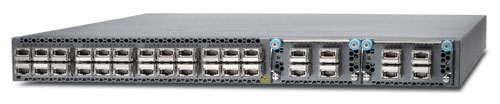
QFX5100 Ethernet switch

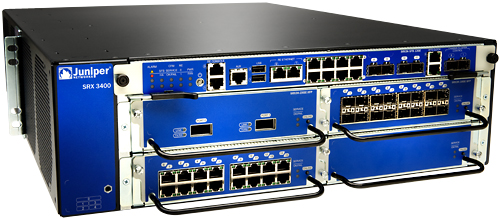
SRX3400 service gateway and security appliance

=== Routers and switches ===
Juniper Networks' first product was the Junos router operating system, which was released on July 1, 1998. The first Juniper router was made available that September and was a core router for internet service providers called the M40. It incorporated specialized application-specific integrated circuits (ASIC) for routing internet traffic that were developed in partnership with IBM. It had ten times the throughput of comparable contemporary Cisco products. The M40 was followed by the smaller M20 router in December 1999 and the M160 in March 2000.

By 2000, Juniper had developed five hardware systems and made seven new releases of its Junos operating system. That April, Juniper released the second generation of the internet processors embedded in its core routers. In April 2002, Juniper released the first of the T-series family (originally known under the code-name Gibson), which could perform four times as many route lookups per second as the M160. The first products of the TX Matrix family, which could be used to combine up to four T-series routers, was released in December 2004.

By 2003, Juniper had diversified into three major router applications: core routers, edge routers and routers for mobile traffic. Juniper's first major diversification from core routers was when it entered the market for edge routers, by acquiring the e-series product family (originally known as ERX) through the purchase of Unisphere in 2000. By 2002, both Cisco and Juniper had increased their focus on edge routers, because many ISPs had built up abundant bandwidth at the core. Several improvements to Juniper's software and its broadband aggregation features were released in late 2003. At this time, Juniper had the largest market-share (52%) of the broadband aggregation market. In 2003, Juniper entered the market for cable-modem termination systems with the G-series product family after the acquisition of Pacific Broadband. The product family was discontinued later that year.

Juniper's first enterprise switch product was the EX 4200, which was released in 2008. In a comparative technical test, Network World said the EX4200 was the top performer out of network switches they tested in latency and throughput, but its multicast features were "newer and less robust" than other aspects of the product. Juniper Networks announced the T1600 1.6 Terabits per second core router in 2007 and the newer T4000 4 Terabit router in 2010. In 2012, it released the ACX family of universal access routers. In 2013, the company made several new releases in the MX family of edge routers: it introduced a smaller version of its core routers called PTX3000, and several new enterprise routers were released. Seven months later, Juniper acquired WANDL, and its technology was integrated into the NorthStar WAN controller Juniper announced in February 2014.

In February 2011, Juniper introduced QFabric, a proprietary protocol methodology for transferring data over a network using a single network layer. Several individual products for the QFabric methodology were released throughout the year. In October 2013, Juniper introduced another network architecture called MetaFabric and a new set of switches, the QFX5100 family, as one of the foundations of the new architecture.

In February 2014, several software and hardware improvements were introduced for Juniper routers, including a series of software applications ISPs could use to provide internet-based services to consumers. In December 2014, Juniper introduced a network switch, OCX1100, that could run on either the Junos operating system or the Open Compute Project open-source software.

=== Security ===
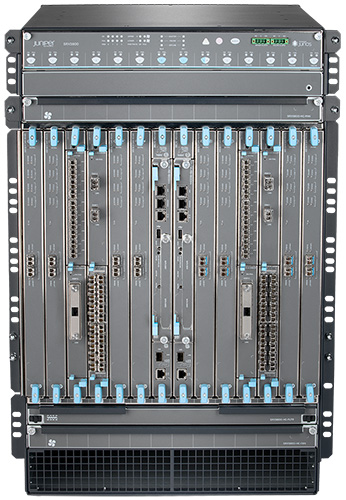
Juniper Networks SRX5800 service gateway and security appliance

Juniper Networks introduced the JProtect security toolkit in May 2003. It included firewalls, flow monitoring, filtering and Network Address Translation (NAT). Through the 2004 acquisition of NetScreen Technologies, Juniper acquired the Juniper Secure Meeting product line, as well as remote desktop access software. The NetScreen-5GT ADSL security appliance was the first new NetScreen product Juniper introduced after the acquisition and its first wireless product. The first Juniper product intended for small businesses was a remote access appliance that was released in August 2004. An open interface for the development of third-party tools for the appliance was made available that September.

In September 2004, Juniper entered the market for enterprise access routers with three routers that were the first of the J-series product family. It used the channel partners acquired with NetScreen to take the routers to market. Juniper released its first dedicated NAC product in late 2005, which was followed by the acquisition of Funk Software for its NAC capabilities for switches. According to a 2006 review in Network World, Juniper's SSG 520 firewall and routing product was "the first serious threat" to competing products from Cisco. Juniper released the SRX family of gateway products in 2008. The gateways sold well, but customers and resellers reported a wide range of technical issues starting in 2010, which Juniper did not acknowledge until 2012, when it began providing updates to the product software.

In August 2011, Juniper and AT&T announced they would jointly develop the AT&T Mobile Security application based on Juniper's Pulse security software. In May 2012, Juniper released a series of new features for the web security software it acquired from Mykonos Software that February. Mykonos' software is focused on deceiving hackers by presenting fake vulnerabilities and tracking their activity. In January 2014, Juniper announced the Firefly Suite of security and switching products for virtual machines. The following month Juniper Networks released several products for "intrusion deception", which create fake files, store incorrect passwords and change network maps in order to confuse hackers that have already penetrated the network perimeter.

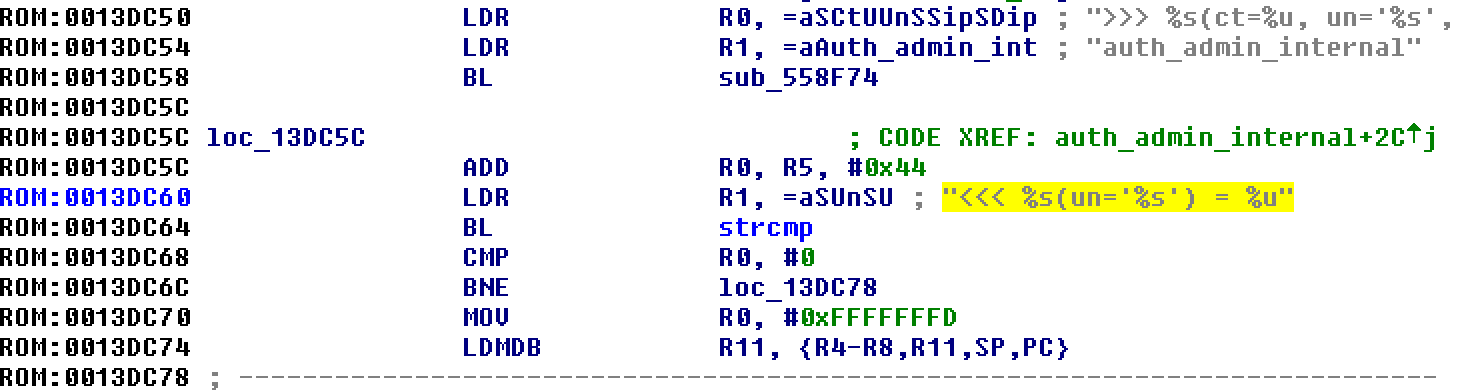
Marked in yellow: backdoor admin password hidden in the code

An analysis of Juniper's ScreenOS firmware code in December 2015 discovered a backdoor key using Dual EC DRBG allowing to passively decrypt the traffic encrypted by ScreenOS. This backdoor was inserted in the year 2008 into the versions of ScreenOS from 6.2.0r15 to 6.2.0r18 and from 6.3.0r12 to 6.3.0r20 and gives any user administrative access when using a special master password. Some analysts claim that this backdoor still exists in ScreenOS. Stephen Checkoway was quoted in Wired that "If this backdoor was not intentional, then, in my opinion, it's an amazing coincidence."

In December 2015, Juniper Systems announced that they had discovered "unauthorized code" in the ScreenOS software that underlies their NetScreen devices, present from 2012 onwards. There were two vulnerabilities: One was a simple root password backdoor, and the other one was changing a point in Dual_EC_DRBG so that the attackers presumably had the key to use the preexisting (intentional or unintentional) kleptographic backdoor in ScreenOS to passively decrypt traffic.

=== Software defined networking ===
According to a 2014 SWOT analysis by MarketLine, in recent history Juniper had been focusing on software-defined networking (SDN). It acquired SDN company Contrail Systems in December 2012. The following month Juniper announced its SDN strategy, which included a new licensing model based on usage and new features for the Junos operating system. In February 2013, Juniper released several SDN products, including the application provisioning software, Services Activation Director and the Mobile Control Gateway appliance.

In May 2013, Juniper announced an SDN controller called JunosV Contrail, using technology it acquired through Contrail Systems. A series of SDN products were released in February 2014, such as a network management software product, Junos Fusion, and an SDN controller called NorthStar. Northstar helps find the optimal path for data to travel through a network.

Every year, since 2009, Juniper held the SDN Throwdown competition to encourage students from universities across the world to access NorthStar Controller and build a solution around it to optimize network throughput. In the 2019 competition, team led by Sumit Maheshwari (Rutgers University) took first place. Jialu Sun (Santa Clara University) led his team to a second-place finish.

=== Recent updates ===
In March 2015, Juniper announced a series of updates to the PTX family of core routers, the QFX family of switches, as well as updates to its security portfolio. According to a report published by technology consulting firm LexInnova, as of June 2015 Juniper Networks was the third largest recipient of network security-related patents with portfolio of 2,926 security-related patents.

In October 2018, Juniper announced a new offering called EngNet, which is a set of developer tools and information meant to help companies move toward automation, and replace the typical command-line interface.

== Operations ==
Prior to its acquisition by HPE, Juniper Networks had operations in more than 100 countries. Around 50% of its revenue was from the United States, 30% was from EMEA and 20% was from Asia. Juniper sold directly to businesses, as well as through resale and distribution partners, such as Ericsson, IBM, Nokia, IngramMicro and NEC. About 50% of Juniper's revenues were derived from routers, 13% from switches, 12% from IT security and 25% from services.

According to a 2013 report by Glassdoor, Juniper Networks had the highest paid software engineers in the technology sector by a margin of about $24,000 per year. It operated the Juniper Networks Academic Alliance (JNAA) program, which scouts fresh college graduates.

According to a SWOT analysis by MarketLine, Juniper had "a strong focus" on research and development. R&D expenses had been between 22 and 25% of revenue from 2011 to 2013. Most of the company's manufacturing was outsourced to three manufacturing companies: Celestica, Flextronics and Accton Technology. Juniper operated the Junos Innovation Fund, which was started with $50 million in 2010 and invests in early-stage technology companies developing applications for the Junos operating system. As of 2011, Juniper Networks invested in 20 companies. This is estimated to be 1 to 2% of the companies it had evaluated for a potential investment.

== ScreenOS Backdoor ==
In December 2015, Juniper issued an emergency security patch for a backdoor in its security equipment. Together with another vulnerability it allowed to bypass authentication and decrypt VPN traffic on ScreenOS. Analysis showed that the mechanism of the backdoor was created by the NSA, but might later have been taken over by an unnamed national government.

== See also ==
- HPE Networking
- List of networking hardware vendors
