= Junos OS =

Real-time operating system (RTOS) software

- Developer: Juniper Networks
- OS family: Unix-like
- Working state: Current
- Source model: Closed source and open source
- Initial release: July 7, 1998; 28 years ago
- Latest release: 25.4 / December 22, 2025; 9 months ago
- Available in: English
- Userland: FreeBSD or Linux
- Default user interface: Command-line interface
- License: Proprietary, FreeBSD License, GPL License
- Official website: www.juniper.net/us/en/products/network-operating-system.html

Junos OS (also known as Juniper Junos, Junos and JUNOS) is a FreeBSD-based, and later also Linux-based, network operating system used in Juniper Networks routing, switching and security devices.

== Versions ==
Junos OS was first made available on 7 July 1998. As of 2008, feature updates have been released quarterly.

== Architecture ==
Junos operating system is primarily based on FreeBSD on bare metal and later also with Linux kernel. Because FreeBSD is a Unix implementation, users can access a Unix shell and execute normal Unix commands. Junos runs on most or all Juniper hardware systems. After acquisition of NetScreen by Juniper Networks, Juniper integrated ScreenOS security functions into its own Junos network operating system.

Junos OS has several architecture variations:

- Junos OS on bare metal (deprecated): It's based on a 32 bits FreeBSD-4 kernel. Starting with R15.1 it's based on 64 bits FreeBSD-10.
- Junos OS on guest virtual machine: Starting with R16.1, FreeBSD runs on a Linux VM host. Since R21.1 it's based on FreeBSD-12. Since R24.2 it's based on FreeBSD-14.
- Junos OS Evolved on bare metal: R18.3 is the first Evolved version, based on Linux kernel and providing direct access to all the Linux utilities and operations, boot up times significantly shortened.

== Features ==
=== Junos SDK ===
Junos's ecosystem includes a Software Development Kit (SDK). Juniper Developer Network (JDN) provides the Junos SDK to the 3rd-party developers who want to develop applications for Junos-powered devices such as Juniper Networks routers, switches, and service gateway systems. It provides a set of tools and application programming interfaces (APIs), including interfaces to Junos routing, firewall filter, UI and traffic services functions. Additionally, Junos SDK is used to develop other Juniper's products such as OpenFlow for Junos, and other traffic services.

=== Command-line interface ===
The Junos OS command-line interface (CLI) is a text-based command interface for configuring, troubleshooting, and monitoring the Juniper device and network traffic associated with it. It supports two types of command modes.

- Operational Mode – Monitors hardware status and displays information about network data that passes through or into the hardware.
- Configuration Mode – Configures the Juniper router, switch, or security device, by adding, deleting, or modifying statements in the configuration hierarchy.

=== FIPS 140-2 security compliance ===
Junos-FIPS 140-2 Security Compliance is a variation of Junos OS, providing users with software tools to configure a network of Juniper Networks devices in a Federal Information Processing Standards (FIPS) environment.

=== Juniper Extension Toolkit (JET) ===
Junos OS offers programming interfaces and the Juniper Extension Toolkit (JET). JET is a standard component of Junos OS, and it runs on all Juniper routers, switches, and security devices. JET simplifies the automation of operational, configuration, and management tasks, providing a set of open and customizable APIs for control, management, and data planes. It supports standardized programming languages for application development and communication to the Junos OS fast programmable database through standardized and open data exchange formats. It also opens up Trio and Express ASICs via a set of third-party controller-specific adapters, including SAI, OpenFlow, and P4.

=== Junos Fusion ===
Junos Fusion is a logical device used to reduce network complexity and operational expenses. Two different Junos Fusion architectures are available, one for provider edge and one for enterprise.

=== Node slicing ===
Node slicing is a Junos OS feature that enables creating multiple partitions from one physical MX Series router. Each partition behaves as an independent router, with its own dedicated control plane, data plane, and management plane, allowing it to run multiple services on one physical router.

=== Routing protocols and applications ===
Junos OS supports a variety of routing protocols and applications. It also supports class of service (CoS), Ethernet VPN (EVPN), firewall filters and policers, flow monitoring, and Layer 2 features. The Junos OS supports high availability mechanisms that are not standard to Unix, such as Graceful Restart. Junos supports a variety of routing protocols. With the introduction of the SRX and J-series (past version 9.3) platforms, it also supports "flow mode", which includes stateful firewalling, NAT, and IPsec. Junos OS generally adheres to industry standards for routing and MPLS.

=== Secure boot ===
Secure boot is a system security enhancement based on the Unified Extensible Firmware Interface (UEFI) standard. It works by safeguarding the Basic Input/Output System (BIOS) from tampering or modification and then maintaining that protection throughout the boot process. The secure boot process begins with secure flash, which ensures that unauthorized changes cannot be made to the firmware. Authorized releases of Junos OS carry a digital signature produced by either Juniper Networks directly or one of its authorized partners.
