= Cisco ASR =

Line of modular internet routers

The Cisco Aggregation Services Router (ASR) series of routers are modular routers produced by Cisco Systems. The highest end of the lineup, the ASR 9000 series, is intended for service provider (SP) core networks.

== History ==
Networking equipment was traditionally categorized by functionality as being either a switch or a router. Switches bridged (transmitted) L2/Ethernet traffic, and a router forwarded (transmitted and routed) L3/IP traffic. As products became more sophisticated, the distinction between a switch and a router became blurred as high-end switches began to route traffic in addition to bridging, and likewise routers began to perform L2 switching. At the same time, the enterprise market was diverging from the service provider market. Though still maintaining the terms switch and router in their product names, Cisco divided their high-end networking products by market. However, many enterprise customers chose equipment Cisco categorized under the banner of being intended for service providers, and vice versa.

Prior to the ASR 9000 series, Cisco's high-end SP product portfolio consisted of the CRS-1, the GSR, and the 7600 (and the 6500). The ASR 9000 series devices are the successor to both the GSR and the 7600. When the CRS-1 is deployed in a large network at the core, the ASR 9000 complements it on the edge; both run IOS-XR. In 2011, Cisco announced capacity upgrades and support of network Virtualization (nV) capabilities for the ASR 9000. In 2011, the ASR 9000 was awarded "Best Carrier Ethernet Aggregation Product" at the Carrier Ethernet World Congress.

== Models ==
=== ASR 900 series ===
The ASR 900 series is a chassis-based modular router that runs the Cisco IOS XE Linux-based operating system.

=== ASR 920 series ===
The ASR 920 series is a chassis-based modular router running Cisco IOS XE.

=== ASR 1000 series ===
The ASR 1000 series is chassis-based modular router running Cisco IOS XE.

=== ASR 9000 series ===
Cisco ASR 9000 series routers are routers designed for the service provider market. It runs the IOS XR Linux-based operating system.

Its major characteristics are:

- IOS XR uses a less verbose configuration syntax compared to Cisco IOS and Cisco IOS XE
- Designed for Metro Ethernet networks
- Designed for video and other high bandwidth applications
- Supports a variety of interface types, those commonly used by Service Providers

== IOS XR release support ==
Date	Release	Details
2008	3.7.2	Initial release of ASR 9000
2009	3.7.3	
2009	3.9.0	
2010	3.9.1	
2010	4.0.0	
2011	4.0.1	
2011	4.1.0	
2011	4.1.1	
