= EEM =

EEM may refer to

- Eem, a river in the central Netherlands
- EEM (psychedelic), a drug
- EEM syndrome
- Embedded event manager
- Energy efficient mortgage
- Entesa de l'Esquerra de Menorca
- Excitation-emission matrix
