= CRS-3 =

CRS-3 or CRS3 may also refer to:

- CRS-3, the second generation of Cisco Systems' Carrier Routing System.
- SpaceX CRS-3 (SpX-3), the third International Space Station resupply mission by SpaceX
- Cygnus CRS Orb-3 (CRS-3), the third International Space Station resupply mission by Orbital Sciences Corporation
- Calgary/Christiansen Field Aerodrome (TC id: CRS3) airport near Okotoks, Alberta, Canada.

== See also ==
- CRS (disambiguation)
