= PITI =

Sum for determining mortgage payments

In relation to a mortgage, PITI (pronounced like the word "pity") is the sum of the monthly principal, interest, taxes, and insurance, the component costs that add up to the monthly mortgage payment in most mortgages. That is, PITI is the sum of the monthly loan service (principal and interest) plus the monthly property tax payment, homeowners insurance premium, and, when applicable, mortgage insurance premium and homeowners association fee. For mortgagers whose property tax payments and homeowners insurance premiums are escrowed as part of their monthly housing payment, PITI therefore is the monthly "bottom line" of what they call their "mortgage payment" (although more precisely it is a combined payment of mortgage, tax, insurance, and any fees).

== PITI's role in qualifying borrowers for mortgages ==
=== Reserves ===
Lending institutions often use a multiple of the PITI payment amount as the minimum amount of seasoned assets a borrower must document ("state") as a reserve when qualifying for a mortgage. The reserve shows that the borrower could continue to pay his/her monthly payment for several months even if his/her income was temporarily interrupted. This reduces the risk of default, making the borrower a safer bet for the lender.

For example, if a mortgage lender requires 2 months' worth of PITI to qualify for a specific loan, and the PITI payment for the loan equals $1500/month, the borrower must document or 'state' (depending on Mortgage Loan Documentation requirements) $1500 x 2(months) = $3000 in seasoned assets.

PITI must come directly from one of the borrower's seasoned asset accounts that can be verified. Acceptable verifiable accounts include VODs (Verification of Deposit), checking accounts, savings accounts, 401k and other retirement plans, and stocks.

Each bank or lender's asset and reserve requirements will vary. Before the 2007 subprime mortgage financial crisis, typical reserve requirements were 2 months PITI for owner-occupied properties, 3 to 4 months for second home and vacation properties, and 6 months for investment properties. Low-payment programs such as negative amortization usually required 3 to 4 months of assets for an owner occupied home because of the relative risk of such a loan.

=== Debt-to-income ratios (DTIs) ===
Another way in which lenders try to minimize the risk of default is by requiring that PITI not be more than a certain maximum percentage of the borrower's monthly gross income—that is, they specify maximum debt-to-income ratios (DTIs). The two DTIs that lenders are most interested in are:

1. the ratio of PITI to monthly gross income;
2. and the ratio of all debt service (PITI + payments for credit cards, car loans, student loans, etc.) to monthly gross income.

The specific maximum values that a lender will allow for each of those DTIs depend on country, region, and era. However, the optimal DTI is less than 36%, while some lenders would accept a highly qualified candidate with a ratio of up to 50%.
