= CRS-1 =

CRS-1 may refer to:

- Cisco CRS-1, a family of Cisco's Carrier Routing System
- SpaceX CRS-1, flight for SpaceX's uncrewed Dragon cargo spacecraft
- Cygnus CRS-1, flight for Orbital Sciences Cygnus cargo spacecraft
- Commercial Resupply Services — Phase 1 Missions of NASA

== See also ==
- CRS (disambiguation)
