= Peerform =

Peer-to-peer lending company based on New York City

Peerform, Inc.
- Type: Private
- Industry: Financial services
- Founded: 2010
- Founders: Mikael Rapaport (CEO)
- Headquarters: New York City, New York, United States
- Products: Peer‑to‑peer lending marketplace
- Services: Online personal loans; loan matching
- Website: www.peerform.com

Peerform is a peer-to-peer lending company based in New York City, which matches prime and near-prime qualified borrowers in the United States to accredited high net worth and institutional investors on its online platform. Its algorithm to determine loan eligibility focuses on a variety of factors including but not limited to FICO scores.

== History ==
The company was founded in 2010 by Mikael Rapaport. In 2011, it raised $1.3 million during an angel funding round. Gregg Schoenberg joined the company's board of directors in 2012 and serves as its executive chairman.

In 2014, it raised $1.1 million in a seed funding round led by Corporest Development, a European investment firm.

In April 2014, Peerform entered into several agreements under which institutional lenders will fund whole loans on Peerform's platform with a fixed interest rate set by Peerform's algorithm. In 2024, Time listed Peerform as one of the "three principal U.S. players" in the peer-to-peer lending industry.

== Business Model ==
Peerform provides an online personal loan platform which acts as a marketplace between potential borrowers and investors who lend money. It only accepts accredited investors under SEC Reg D Rule 506(c) or institutional investors to lend money on its platform. Borrowers are screened on a variety of factors so as to ascertain what Peerform defines as “creditworthiness”. Peerform accepts near-prime (see Subprime lending) and prime borrowers with Credit Scores as low as 600 (and above). Each borrower is presented a fixed APR (and fixed interest rate) with an equal repayment scheme that allows them to pay back the loan in automatic bank debits spread out over 3 years.

Investors choose between funding a whole loan or a fraction of a loan. Loans range from a minimum of $1,000 to a maximum of $25,000, which has increased from an earlier maximum loan of $15,000.

=== Peerform Loan Analyzer ===
The Peerform Loan Analyzer is the unique algorithm used to determine if a person can qualify for a Peerform personal loan. According to Peerform, FICO scores cannot solely determine whether or not someone can qualify for a loan. FICO is one of many factors used in determining this qualification as well as in setting the borrower's interest rate, but other factors, such as a borrower's total current debt-to-income ratio and the number of recent credit inquiries into the borrower's credit history, are taken into account among other things. The Peerform Loan Analyzer also uses empirical methods instead of standard filters in determining a borrower's APR rate, which the company believes will better calculate consumer credit risk.
