= CRS-2 =

CRS-2 may refer to:

- SpaceX CRS-2, SpX-2, flight for SpaceX's uncrewed Dragon cargo spacecraft
- Cygnus CRS Orb-2, CRS-2, flight for Orbital Sciences Cygnus cargo spacecraft
- NASA Commercial Resupply Services — Phase 2
- List of heliports in Canada#188, Parry Sound Medical Heliport (CRS2)

== See also ==
- CRS (disambiguation)
