= Paroli (disambiguation) =

Paroli is a late 17th-century French gambling card game.

Paroli may also refer to:

- PAROLI, a proprietary protocol used inside a multi-shelf Carrier Routing System from Cisco

== People ==
- Adriano Paroli (born 1962), an Italian politician and lawyer
- Giovanni Paroli (1856–1920), an Italian operatic tenor
- Julienne Paroli (1882–1959), a French film actress
- Orfeo Paroli (1906–1980), an Italian rower
