= Mortgage Credit Directive =

European Parliament and Council of the European Union
- Passed: 4 February 2014
- Enacted: March 2016
- Status: Current legislation

The Mortgage Credit Directive (MCD) is a body of European Union legislation for the regulation of first- and second charge mortgages and consumer buy-to-let (CBTL) lending. It was originally adopted by the European Commission on 4 February 2014 and Member states had to transpose the regulations in their national law by March 2016. The European Commission is currently planning to propose amendments to the directive in Q1 2024.

The Directive introduces a European framework of conduct standards for firms selling residential mortgages.

The objective of the Directive is to create a Union-wide mortgage credit market, with a high level of consumer protection.

== Overview ==
The Mortgage Credit Directive (MCD) lays down rules for creditors, credit intermediaries and appointed sales representatives relating to the residential immovable market. The MCD applies to credit agreements that are secured by a residential mortgage and to credit agreements that have the purpose to acquire or retain property rights in land or in an existing or projected building. The MCD was introduced by the European Union (EU) as implementation of the G20 commitment to establish principles on sound underwriting standards and to improve the conditions for the establishment of an internal market in the area of credit agreements relating to residential immovable property. Furthermore, the Mortgage Credit Directive was designed as a preventive measure to avoid irresponsible lending and borrowing behaviour by market participants in the EU and to avoid a situation similar to what happened in the United States in 2006–2008, where a real estate bubble affected over half of the United States and left many American citizens either homeless or in huge debts.

The Mortgage Credit Directive establishes common rules in the residential immovable market to better inform customers about the real costs of a mortgage, to enable customers to better compare between competitors and to reflect on the mortgage contract before contract closure. It introduces measures to better protect mortgage customers from unfair and misleading practices.

== History ==
In March 2003, the Commission initiated a process to identify and assess the impact of barriers to the internal market for credit agreements relating to residential property. In December 2007, the Commission adopted a White Paper on the Integration of EU Mortgage Credit Markets. They established an Expert Group on Credit History to prepare measures to improve credit data. The 2008 financial crisis revealed a series of problems existent in the residential mortgage market. These problems related to irresponsible borrowing and lending and to the potential scope for misbehavior by market participants.

In March 2009, the Commission has proposed measures in its Communication entitled ‘Driving European Recovery’ on 4 March, to deliver responsible markets for the future and restore consumer confidence in the residential immovable market. In March 2011, the European Commission adopted the proposal for a Directive on credit agreements relating to residential property. In February 2014, the Mortgage Credit Directive 2014/17/EU was adopted and the Directive was implemented in the Member States by March 2016.

In 2021, the European Commission launched a consultation process as preamble towards reviewing the directive, in order to adapte the current rules to the digital era, to foster cross-border mortgage supply, and to boost the uptake of "energy-efficient mortgages".

== Key aspects ==
The Mortgage Credit Directive (MCD) is a body of legislation that encompasses all mortgage lending to consumers. Credit agreements relating to residential immovable property for business purposes fall outside the scope of the legislation.

=== Documentation and Presale Disclosure Requirements ===
==== European Standardised Information Sheet (ESIS) ====
The Regulation requires direct and indirect mortgage sellers to provide the customer with a European Standardised Information Sheet (ESIS), in which the key features and risks of the mortgage contract are disclosed to the customer before contract closure. In many countries there already exists a paper which discloses information with regards to the mortgage contract, but the ESIS extends and clarifies this information. Included in the ESIS is a right of a seven-day reflection period, and information regarding the potential impact of interest rate changes. Furthermore, the ESIS sets out an Annual Percentage Rate of Charge (APRC) and provides example monthly payments in the case the interest rate rises to the highest level of the past 20 years. The ESIS must be issued in good time before the conclusion of the credit agreement, to enable the customer to compare and reflect on the mortgage contract and enable the customer to ask for third party advice.

==== Annual Percentage Rate of Charge (APRC) ====
The Directive includes a formula that should be used to present the customer the Annual Percentage Rate of Charge. The APRC allows customers to oversee the overall costs of the mortgage contract and to better compare between different offers.

=== Conduct and Procedural Requirements ===
==== Binding Offers ====
Lenders are required to make a binding offer in relation to the mortgage contract. In the UK jurisdiction lenders were allowed to make conditional offers. This right remains preserved if a binding offer is made at a later stage of the process.

==== 7-day Reflection period ====
The Directive sets out a requirement for borrowers to have the right of a seven-day reflection. The Directive leaves it to the Member States to decide whether this right should be granted in the pre-sale period, in the post-sale period or as a combination of the two.

==== Tying and Bundling ====
The Directive lays down specific rules for tying practises, which is the practise whereby a set of products or services has to be purchased together with the credit agreement. Combining credit agreements with other financial products or services is a mean for creditors to diversify and compete with other creditors. However, it may negatively affect customers’ mobility if the products can not be bought separately. Hence, the Directive helps to prevent tying practises that are not in the best interest of the customer, without constricting product bundling which can be beneficial to the mortgage customer.

==== Property Valuations ====
Member States should ensure that reliable valuation standards are in place to appropriately value immovable residential property before the conclusion of the credit agreement. These valuation standards should include internationally recognised valuation standards such as the standards developed by the International Valuation Standards Committee, the European Group of Valuers’ Associations or the Royal Institution of Chartered Surveyors.

==== Foreign Currency Mortgages ====
The Directive proposes certain protection measures for credit agreements in a foreign currency due to the significant risks attached for the consumer. Hence, Member States must ensure that the customer has the right to convert the credit agreement to an alternative currency or that there are other arrangements in place that limit the risk the customer is exposed to in foreign currency loans.

==== Knowledge and Competency ====
The Mortgage Credit Directive provides harmonised rules as regards the fields of knowledge and competence that creditors, credit intermediaries and appointed representatives’ staff should possess in order to achieve a high level of professionalism. Member States should provide adequate monitoring to ensure that these knowledge- and competence requirements are applied. In addition, the Directive states that Member States should promote measures to support the education of mortgage customers in order to increase his or her ability to make an informed decision.

==== Advertisement ====
Member States should include or maintain disclosure requirements in their national law regarding the advertising of residential mortgages. These requirements ensure customer protection from unfair and misleading advertisements. Specific provisions regarding the advertisement of credit agreements should be given to enable customers to compare different offers and prevent them from a misleading impression of the product. Furthermore, the Directive states that advice given by mortgage providers should be in the best interest of the customer.

==== Assessment of Customers’ Creditworthiness ====
Member States should issue additional guidance on criteria and methods to assess a client's creditworthiness and they are encouraged to implement the Financial Stability Board's Principles for Sound Residential Mortgage Underwriting practises in this respective. It is deemed to be essential that the customer's ability to refinance the credit agreement is assessed and verified before the conclusion of the credit agreement. The assessment should take into consideration all relevant factors that could impact a customer's ability to repay the loan. Reasonable allowance should be made for future events that could negatively impact this ability. Furthermore, the possibility of an increase in residential immovable property value should not be taken as a sufficient condition for granting the credit.

==== Early Repayment ====
Member States should ensure that customers have a right to early repayment. A customer's ability, to repay to mortgage prior to the expiry of the mortgage credit agreement, may play an important role in order for customers to compare different credit offers and enhances competition in the internal credit market. Furthermore, the right to early repayment promotes financial stability within the Union.
