= Debt-to-income ratio =

% of gross income paid towards debts

In the consumer mortgage industry, debt-to-income ratio (DTI) is the percentage of a consumer's monthly gross income that goes toward paying debts. (Speaking precisely, DTIs often cover more than just debts; they can include principal, taxes, fees, and insurance premiums as well. Nevertheless, the term is a set phrase that serves as a convenient, well-understood shorthand.) There are two main kinds of DTI, as discussed below.

== Two main kinds of DTI ==
The two main kinds of DTI are expressed as a pair using the notation $x/y$ (for example, 28/36).

1. The first DTI, known as the front-end ratio, indicates the percentage of income that goes toward housing costs, which for renters is the rent amount and for homeowners is PITI (mortgage principal and interest, mortgage insurance premium [when applicable], hazard insurance premium, property taxes, and homeowners' association dues [when applicable]).
2. The second DTI, known as the back-end ratio, indicates the percentage of income that goes toward paying all recurring debt payments, including those covered by the first DTI, and other debts such as credit card payments, car loan payments, student loan payments, child support payments, alimony payments, and legal judgments.

== Example ==
If the lender requires a debt-to-income ratio of 28/36, then to qualify a borrower for a mortgage, the lender would go through the following process to determine what expense levels they would accept:

- Using yearly figures:
  - Gross income of $45,000
  - $45,000 × .28 = $12,600 allowed for housing expense.
  - $45,000 × .36 = $16,200 allowed for housing expense plus recurring debt.
- Using monthly figures:
  - Gross income of $3,750 (=$45,000/12)
  - $3,750 × .28 = $1,050 allowed for housing expense.
  - $3,750 × .36 = $1,350 allowed for housing expense plus recurring debt.

== DTI limits used in qualifying borrowers ==
=== United States ===
==== Conforming loans ====
In the United States, for conforming loans, the following limits are currently typical:

- Fannie Mae generally permits a total DTI of up to 36% for manually underwritten loans, or up to 45% when its credit-score and reserve requirements are met.
- FHA limits are currently 31/43. When using the FHA's Energy Efficient Mortgage program, however, the "stretch ratios" of 33/45 are used
- VA loan limits are only calculated with one DTI of 41. (This is effectively equal to 41/41, although VA does not use that notation.)
- USDA 29/41

==== Nonconforming loans ====
Back ratio limits up to 55 became common for nonconforming loans in the 2000s, as the financial industry experimented with looser credit, with innovative terms and mechanisms, fueled by a real estate bubble. The mortgage business underwent a shift as the traditional mortgage banking industry was shadowed by an infusion of lending from the shadow banking system that eventually rivaled the size of the conventional financing sector. The subprime mortgage crisis produced a market correction that revised these limits downward again for many borrowers, reflecting a predictable tightening of credit after the laxness of the credit bubble. Creative financing (involving riskier ratios) still exists, but nowadays is granted with tighter, more sensible qualification of customers.

==== Historical limits ====
The business of lending and borrowing money has evolved qualitatively in the post–World War II era. It was not until that era that the FHA and the VA (through the G.I. Bill) led the creation of a mass market in 30-year, fixed-rate, amortized mortgages. It was not until the 1970s that the average working person carried credit card balances (more information at Credit card#History). Thus the typical DTI limit in use in the 1970s was PITI<25%, with no codified limit for the second DTI ratio (the one including credit cards). In other words, in today's notation, it could be expressed as 25/25, or perhaps more accurately, 25/NA, with the NA limit left to the discretion of lenders on a case-by-case basis. In the following decades these limits gradually climbed higher, and the second limit was codified (coinciding with the evolution of modern credit scoring), as lenders determined empirically how much risk was profitable. This empirical process continues today.

=== Canada ===
The Vanier Institute of the Family measures debt to income as total family debt to net income. This is a different ratio, because it compares a cashflow number (yearly after-tax income) to a static number (accumulated debt) - rather than to the debt payment as above. The Institute reported on February 17, 2010 that the average Canadian Family owes $100,000, therefore having a debt to net income after taxes of 150%

=== United Kingdom ===
The Bank of England (as of June 26, 2014) implemented a debt to income multiplier on mortgages of 4.5 (A consumer mortgage can be 4.5 times the size of annual income), in an attempt to cool rapidly rising house prices. Previously internal standards were relied upon in order to assess the risk of defaults however in the wake of the 2008 financial crisis it was decided that the risk of contagion between housing markets was too great in order to rely solely on voluntary regulation.

=== New Zealand ===
In New Zealand, the Reserve Bank introduced Debt-to-Income (DTI) restrictions starting from July 1, 2024. These rules limit how much banks can lend based on a borrower's income. For example, banks can only make up to 20% of new owner-occupier loans to borrowers with a DTI ratio over 6, and 20% of new investor loans to borrowers with a DTI ratio over 7

== See also ==
- Debt ratio, for companies
- Debt-to-GDP ratio, for governments
