= Self-reflection =

Capacity of humans to exercise introspection

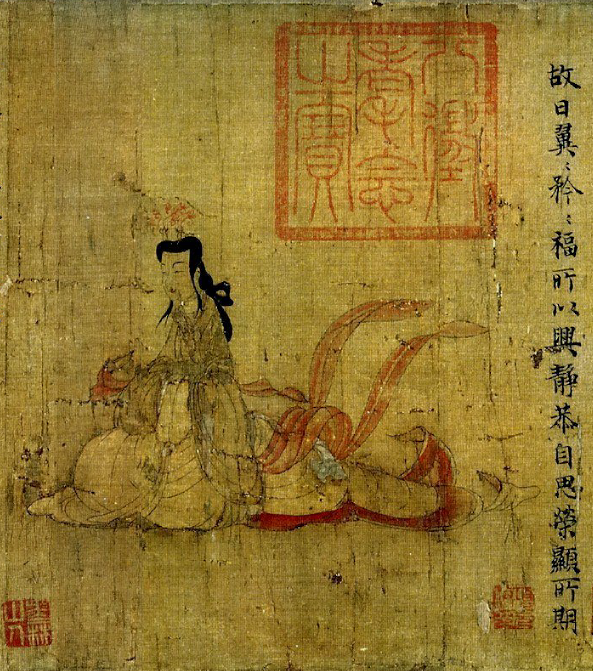
This next to last scene of the Admonitions Scroll shows a palace lady sitting in quiet contemplation, presumably following the admonitions in the accompanying lines: "Therefore I say: Be cautious and circumspect in all you do, and from this, good fortune will arise. Calmly and respectfully think about your actions, and honor and fame will await you."

Self-reflection is the ability to witness and evaluate one's own cognitive, emotional, and behavioural processes. In psychology, other terms used for this self-observation include "reflective awareness" and "reflective consciousness", which originate from the work of William James.

Self-reflection depends upon a range of functions, including introspection and metacognition, which develop from infancy through adolescence, affecting how individuals interact with others, and make decisions.

Self-reflection is related to the philosophy of consciousness, the topic of awareness, and the philosophy of mind.

The concept of self-reflection is ancient. More than 3,000 years ago, "Know thyself" was the first of three Delphic maxims inscribed in the forecourt of the Temple of Apollo at Delphi. It is also considered a form of thought that generates new meaning and an opportunity to engage with what seemingly appears incongruous.

== History ==
=== Early writings ===
Notions about the status of humanity may be revealed by the etymology of ancient words for humans. Latin homo (PIE *dʰǵʰm̥mō) means "of the earth, earthling", probably in opposition to "celestial" beings. Greek ἂνθρωπος (mycenaean *Anthropos) means "low-eyed", again probably contrasting with a divine perspective.

From the third-millennium Old Kingdom of Egypt, belief in an eternal afterlife of the human ka is documented along with the notion that the actions of a person would be assessed to determine the quality of that existence. A claim of dominance of humanity alongside radical pessimism because of the frailty and brevity of human life is asserted in the Hebrew Bible Genesis 1:28, where dominion of humans is promised, but contrarily, King Solomon who is the alleged author of Ecclesiastes according to rabbinic tradition, bewails the vanity of all human effort.

=== Classical antiquity ===
Protagoras made the famous claim that humans are "the measure of all things; of what is, that it is; of what is not, that it is not". Socrates advocated the ancient adage for all humans to "Know thyself", and gave the (doubtlessly tongue-in-cheek) definition of humans as, "featherless bipeds" (Plato, Politicus). Aristotle described humans as the "communal animal" (ζῶον πολιτικόν), i.e., emphasizing society-building as a central trait of human nature, and being a "thought bearer animal" (ζῶον λόγον ἔχον, animal rationale) a term that also may have inspired the species taxonomy, Homo sapiens.

=== Middle Ages ===
The dominant world-view of medieval Europe, as directed by the Catholic Church, was that human existence is essentially good and created in "original grace", but because of concupiscence, is marred by sin, and that its aim should be to focus on a beatific vision after death. The term "original grace" is not a phrase directly derived by the Bible, but is used because it reflects the Catholic Church's interpretation of humanity's initial state before the Fall. According to St. Augustine, the Fall corrupted this "original grace" and therefore the nature of man.

The thirteenth century pope Innocent III wrote about the essential misery of earthly existence in his "On the misery of the human condition"—a view that was disputed by, for example, Giannozzo Manetti in his treatise "On human dignity".

=== Renaissance ===
A famous quote of Shakespeare's Hamlet (II, ii, 115–117), expresses the contrast of human physical beauty, intellectual faculty, and ephemeral nature:

What a piece of work is a man! How noble in reason! how infinite in faculties! in form and moving, how express and admirable! in action how like an angel! in apprehension, how like a god! the beauty of the world! the paragon of animals! And yet, to me, what is this quintessence of dust?

Selbstbetrachtung (self-reflection)
pen and ink drawing by Alfred Kubin (c. 1901)

René Descartes famously and succinctly proposed: Cogito ergo sum (French: "Je pense donc je suis"; English: "I think, therefore I am"), not an assessment of humanity, but certainly reflecting a capacity for reasoning as a characteristic of humans, that potentially, could include individual self-reflection.

=== Modern era ===
The Enlightenment was driven by a renewed conviction, that, in the words of Immanuel Kant, "Man is distinguished above all animals by his self-consciousness, by which he is a 'rational animal'." In conscious opposition to this tradition during the nineteenth century, Karl Marx defined humans as a "labouring animal" (animal laborans). In the early twentieth century, Sigmund Freud dealt a serious blow to positivism by postulating that, to a large part, human behaviour is controlled by the unconscious mind. Freud describes the unconscious mind as the part of the mind containing any repressed images or thoughts too taboo for societal norms. He viewed this part of the mind as essential to the individual as they are restrained primitive impulses and desires. Joseph Conrad uses the analogy of chemistry to describe how the tiniest idea can stimulate a person during reflection like a "little drop precipitating the process of crystallization in a test tube containing a colourless solution".

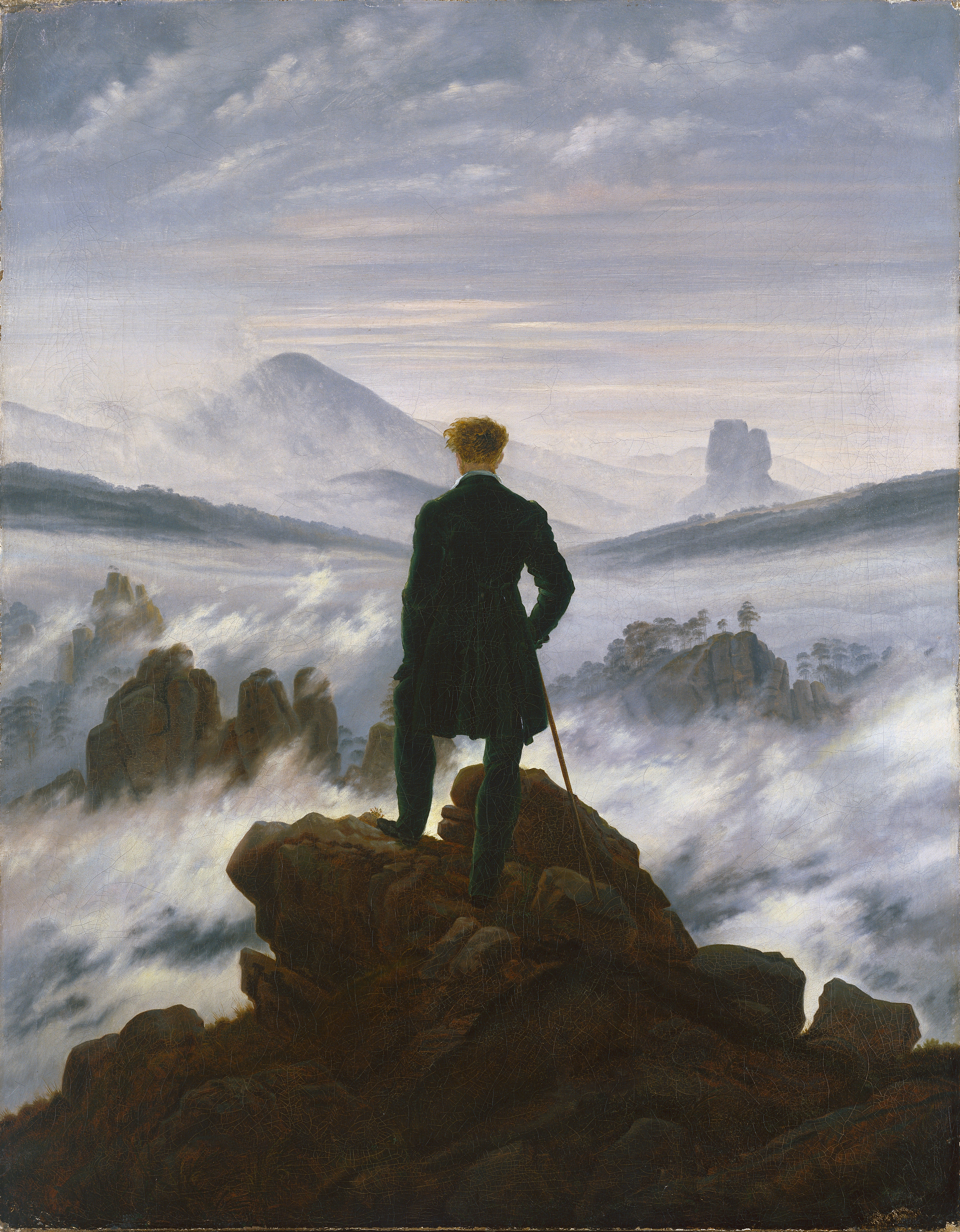
Wanderer above the Sea of Fog by Caspar David Friedrich is a romantic painting expressing self reflection among other uniquely human experiences.

Mandatory or advisory periods for reflection are built into some regulatory requirements, for example changes to divorce law in England and Wales adopted in 2022 prescribe a 20-week period of reflection before certain proceedings are concluded, and the European Union's Mortgage Credit Directive allows for a seven-day period of reflection before a mortgage offer needs to be accepted.

== Impact ==
Self-reflection is a process of communicating internally with oneself. When one takes time to think about their character or behavior, they analyze the reasons that caused the behavior, where this comes from, what the outcome of the behavior means to them, is it effective for them and what they can do about it. Individuals process this information about themselves to help them find methods to deal with the information gained during the self-reflection process and applying this information to future behavior has been shown to elicit strength and joy.

Self-reflection helps people in multiple ways:

First, self-reflection fortifies an individual's emotional stability. When setting aside some effort to self-reflect they are looking inwards. This assists with building two parts to their emotional intelligence: self-awareness and self-concept. Self-awareness enables a person to comprehend their feelings, qualities, shortcomings, drives, and objectives, and recognize their effect on others. Self-concept includes the capacity to control or divert their troublesome feelings and motivations and adjust to changing circumstances. Building these skills will improve both their personal and professional life and language learning.

Second, self-reflection enhances a person's self-esteem and gives transparency for decision-making. Self-esteem is significant for dealing with a filled, complex life that incorporates meetings, vocation, family, network, and self-necessities. It helps in decision-making, effective communication, and building influence. The more they think about their qualities and how they can grow them the more confident they will be later on. A person may become happy with their good qualities and identify the ones that require growth.

Third, the self-reflection process requires honesty from the individual in order to be effective. When a person is honest with themselves when self-reflecting, they are able to understand their experiences; this person can grow and make changes based on what they have learned, leading them to better choices.

Fourth, self-reflection adapts a person's actions in future situations. Making time to step back and consider their behaviors, the consequences of those behaviors, and the expectations of those behaviors can give them a source of a clear insight and learning. A person engaging in self-reflection may ask themselves: What appeared to have a more remarkable impact? How can we accomplish a more significant amount of that and enhance it? This cycle of reflection and variation—before, during, and after actions—is a recognized part of the process.

Failure often comes from our actions, showing up as mistakes. The positive side is that everyone makes mistakes. These mistakes teach us what to avoid in the future. They allow us to learn through "negative examples" or "errorful learning". Many have noted that failures are valuable learning moments because they are temporary. However, we must pause and reflect deliberately to learn from these mistakes truly. This self-reflection is crucial for growth.

=== Organizational development ===
Self-reflection is considered to have a significant impact on how organizations achieve their goals. Incivility has been found to be the most pernicious outcome when members of a group exhibit a lack of self-reflection, decreasing productivity on average by 30%. According to recent self-awareness research, most people believe that they practice self-reflection, when in fact only 10–15% of people studied actually fit the criteria of consistent self-reflection.

== Psychotherapy ==
A study involving clients in a twelve-step program explored the role of self‑reflection through diary writing, not only as daily therapy, but in a retrospective context. The study concluded that clients who read and reflected on their past diary entries demonstrated increased participation in the treatment program. The twelve-step program is based on self reflection and the accountability of actions past. The article by Mitchell Friedman indicates that success in one's recovery relies on self-reflection.

== See also ==
- Affect labeling
- Anthropocentrism
- Gibb's reflective cycle
- Human condition
- Identity (social science)
- Metacognition
- Psychological mindedness
- Wisdom
