= CRS =

CRS may refer to:

== Organisations ==
=== Government related ===
- Career Retention Specialist, a Marine responsible for enlisted retention in U.S. Marine Corps units
- China Reconstruction Society, also known as the Blue Shirts Society, a Fascist clique and secret police or para-military force in the Republic of China between 1931 and 1938
- Commission of Railway Safety, rail safety authority in India
- Common Reporting Standard, an OECD standard for exchange of information
- Community Relations Service, United States Department of Justice branch for CR and civil rights
- Compagnies Républicaines de Sécurité, the French riot-control force
- Congressional Research Service, the public-policy arm of the United States Congress

=== NGO or commercial ===
- Catholic Relief Services, an American international humanitarian agency
- Catholic Record Society, a scholarly society in England and Wales
- Classic Rock Society, a UK-based organisation to promote classic and progressive rock music
- Co-operative Retail Services, a former co-operative society in the United Kingdom
- Creation Research Society, a Christian research group which engages in creation science
- Croatian Register of Shipping, an independent classification society working in the marine market
- Somaschi Fathers (Ordo Clericorum Regularium a Somascha), a charitable religious congregation

== Science and technology ==
=== Medicine and biology ===
- Cambridge Reference Sequence, used in mitochondrial DNA testing
- Caudal regression syndrome, a rare congenital disorder
- Chinese restaurant syndrome, purportedly caused by the flavor enhancer glutamate
- Chronic radiation syndrome, resulting from prolonged exposures to radiation
- Chronic rhinosinusitis
- Congenital rubella syndrome, a disease passed from mother to fetus
- Cutaneous radiation syndrome, a syndrome that results from acute radiation exposure to the skin
- Cytokine release syndrome, in immunology
- Cytoreductive surgery, in cancer treatment

=== Computer science and engineering ===
- Canada Remote Systems, a now-defunct bulletin-board system based in Toronto
- Carrier Routing System, a large-scale core router
- Celestial Reference System(s), see Barycentric and geocentric celestial reference systems
- Cluster Ready Services, components of Oracle Clusterware for database support
- Cold rolled steel
- Commercial Resupply Services, a NASA contract to deliver supplies to space
- Common reference string model, in cryptography
- Computer reservations system (or Central Reservation System), a computerised system used for travel bookings
- Coordinate reference system, used to locate geographical entities

== Other uses ==
- Camp Rising Sun (New York), an international leadership-program for youth development
- Child Rebel Soldier, a former hip-hop supergroup composed of Kanye West, Lupe Fiasco, and Pharrell
- Classroom response system, an interactive teaching tool using "clicker questions"
- Seychellois Creole (ISO 639-3 language code), a French-based creole language of the Seychelles
- Colorado Revised Statutes, the legal code of Colorado
- Cosmic Ray Subsystem, a spacecraft instrument on the Voyager probe that helped detect the interstellar medium
- Consumer Recreation Services, a fictional company which features in the 1997 film The Game

== See also ==
- .crs (disambiguation)
- CRS-1 (disambiguation)

== Distinguish from ==
- seeress, a female prophet
