= Supervisor Engine (Cisco) =

Management card for modular switches

The Cisco Supervisor Engine serves as the management card for modular Cisco switches that can also, in some cases, act as forwarding/routing element.

Over time, the Supervisor Engine has undergone multiple iterations and was different for different modular switches in Cisco Portfolio (Catalyst 4000, 4500, 5000, 5500, 6000, 6500, 9400, 9600 and Nexus switches).

Supervisor Engine typically offers management of entire chassis in modular system, control over its power (PSU, Power Supply Units), cooling (fans) and physical management interfaces, as well as Line Cards (LCs) that host its own physical interfaces to serve user traffic.

Some models of Supervisor Engines can also process traffic, albeit at reduced scale and speed. Typically, traffic processing is distributed to line cards (LCs), which host their own NPUs (Network Processing Units) or ASICs (Application Specific Integrated Circuits) that are programmed by Supervisor to properly forward, filter and otherwise process user traffic. Supervisor Engines can also host switching matrix, that connects line cards together and allows for faster traffic transport between ports on different line cards, as well as can support traffic replication for multicast.

Cisco uses CEF (Cisco Express Forwarding) to create forwarding and routing tables, that in modular switches and routers is distributed using dCEF (distributed CEF). Line Cards that offer distributed forwarding & routing run their own copy of CEF tables thanks to dCEF.

Abridged list of features:

- 802.1q VLAN
- Spanning Tree Protocol
- Ether Channel
- Jumbo Frames
- (E)IGRP, OSPF, RIP (2), Static Routing
- BGP, IS-IS
- QOS
- Layer 3 and 4 Switching

== Specifications ==
Supervisor Engine	Mpps	Switching Layer	Bandwidth	CPU Frequency	Max Ram	Max Flash	OS	Minimum IOS
1	15	2	1.2–32	25 MHz Motorola 68k	128MB	16MB	CatOS	N/A
2	30	2	18	150 MHz Mips R4700	128MB	16MB	CatOS	N/A
2+	48	4	64	266 MHz R4700	256MB	32MB	CatOS/IOS	
3	15	4	?	150–300 MHz	256MB	?	IOS	12.1(8a)
4	48	4	64	333 MHz	512MB	128MB	IOS	12.1(12c)
5	136	4	102	400–800 MHz	512MB	?	IOS	12.2(18)
6	250	4	320	1.3 GHz	1GB	?	IOS	12.2(40)
720	400–450	5	720	600 MHz	2GB	64MB	CatOS/IOS	
32		5	32	300 MHz			IOS	
2T	720	5	2080		4GB	2GB	IOS	

== Details ==
Supervisor Engine I

- 68EC040
- Chassis: 2900, 2948G, 2980G, 4000, 4500, 5000, 5500, 6000, 6500, 7600

Supervisor Engine II

- MIPS R4700
- Chassis: 2926, 4000, 4500, 5000, 5500, 6000, 6500, 7600

Supervisor Engine II+

- MIPS R4700
- Cisco Express Forwarding
- Chassis: 2926, 4000, 4500, 5000, 5500, 6000, 6500, 7600

Supervisor Engine III

- Cisco Express Forwarding
- Max DRAM: 256MB SD
- Redundant Capable
- Netflow accelerator card

Supervisor Engine IV

- Cisco Express Forwarding
- Max Flash: 64MB (supplemental Compact Flash optional)

Supervisor Engine V

- Cisco Express Forwarding
- Chassis: 4500

Supervisor Engine 6

- Cisco Express Forwarding
- Chassis: 4500 "E" Series

Supervisor Engine 32

- Cisco Express Forwarding
- Chassis: 6000, 6500, 7600
- A low cost, reduced version of the 720
- Policy Feature Card 3b
- MSFC 2A?

Supervisor Engine 720

- Cisco Express Forwarding
- Policy Feature Card 3A, 3B, 3BXL
- Chassis: 6500, 7600

MSFC1-3

- Multi-Layer Switch Feature Card

 

== See also ==
- Cisco IOS
- Catalyst switch
- Catalyst 6500
- Cisco Catalyst 4500 Series Switches
