= .crs =

.crs or .CRS may refer to:

- .crs (file extension), an EAGLE filename extension for Gerber bottom solder cream files
- .crs (top-level domain), a top-level domain for Federated Co-operatives

== See also ==
- CRS (disambiguation)
