= Packet Tracer =

Network simulation software

- A magnifying glass over an envelope, with the intersection consisting of a light green grid with a dark green background
- Developer: Cisco Systems
- Stable release: 9.0.0
- Operating system: Windows, Linux, macOS previously: Android, iOS
- Size: 373 MB (Linux); 287 MB (Windows); 406 MB (macOS)
- Available in: English
- Type: Network simulation
- License: Proprietary
- Website: www.netacad.com/courses/packet-tracer

Packet Tracer is a cross-platform visual simulation tool designed by Cisco Systems that allows users to create network topologies and imitate modern computer networks. The software allows users to simulate the configuration of Cisco routers and switches using a simulated command line interface. Packet Tracer makes use of a drag and drop user interface, allowing users to add and remove simulated network devices as they see fit. The software is mainly focused towards Cisco Networking Academy students as an educational tool for helping them learn fundamental CCNA concepts. Previously students enrolled in a CCNA Academy program could freely download and use the tool free of charge for educational use.

== Overview ==
Packet Tracer can be run on Linux, Microsoft Windows, macOS. Apps for mobile operating systems like Android and iOS were also available. Packet Tracer allows users to create simulated network topologies by dragging and dropping routers, switches and various other types of network devices. A physical connection between devices is represented by a 'cable' item. Packet Tracer supports an array of simulated Application Layer protocols, as well as basic routing with RIP, OSPF, EIGRP, and BGP to the extents required by the current CCNA curriculum. As of version 5.3, Packet Tracer also supports the Border Gateway Protocol.

In addition to simulating certain aspects of computer networks, Packet Tracer can also be used for collaboration. As of Packet Tracer 5.0, Packet Tracer supports a multi-user system that enables multiple users to connect multiple topologies together over a computer network. Packet Tracer also allows instructors to create activities that students have to complete. Packet Tracer is often used in educational settings as a learning aid. Cisco Systems claims that Packet Tracer is useful for network experimentation.

== Role in education ==
Packet Tracer allows students to design complex and large networks, which is often not feasible with physical hardware, due to costs. Packet Tracer is commonly used by NetAcad students, since it is available to download after creating a free account. However, due to functional limitations, it is intended by Cisco to be used only as a learning aid, not a replacement for Cisco routers and switches. The application itself only has a small number of features found within the actual hardware running a current Cisco IOS version. Thus, Packet Tracer is unsuitable for modelling production networks. It has a limited command set, meaning it is not possible to practice all of the IOS commands that might be required. Packet Tracer can be useful for understanding abstract networking concepts, such as the Enhanced Interior Gateway Routing Protocol by animating these elements in a visual form. Packet Tracer is also useful in education by providing additional components, including an authoring system, network protocol simulation and improving knowledge an assessment system.

== PTTP protocol and CSR compatibility ==
In 2019, Cisco registered a new URI scheme with the IANA called "pttp". This protocol is used as part of Packet Tracer 7.2.2 capabilities to transmit data between Packet Tracer and Cisco's CSR routing platform. As of mid-2022, little is known about this protocol or its functionality.

== See also ==
- GNS3
- Wireshark
- PT Anywhere - a network simulation environment via a web interface that can be accessed from any web browser
