= Cisco Catalyst =

Ethernet switch product line

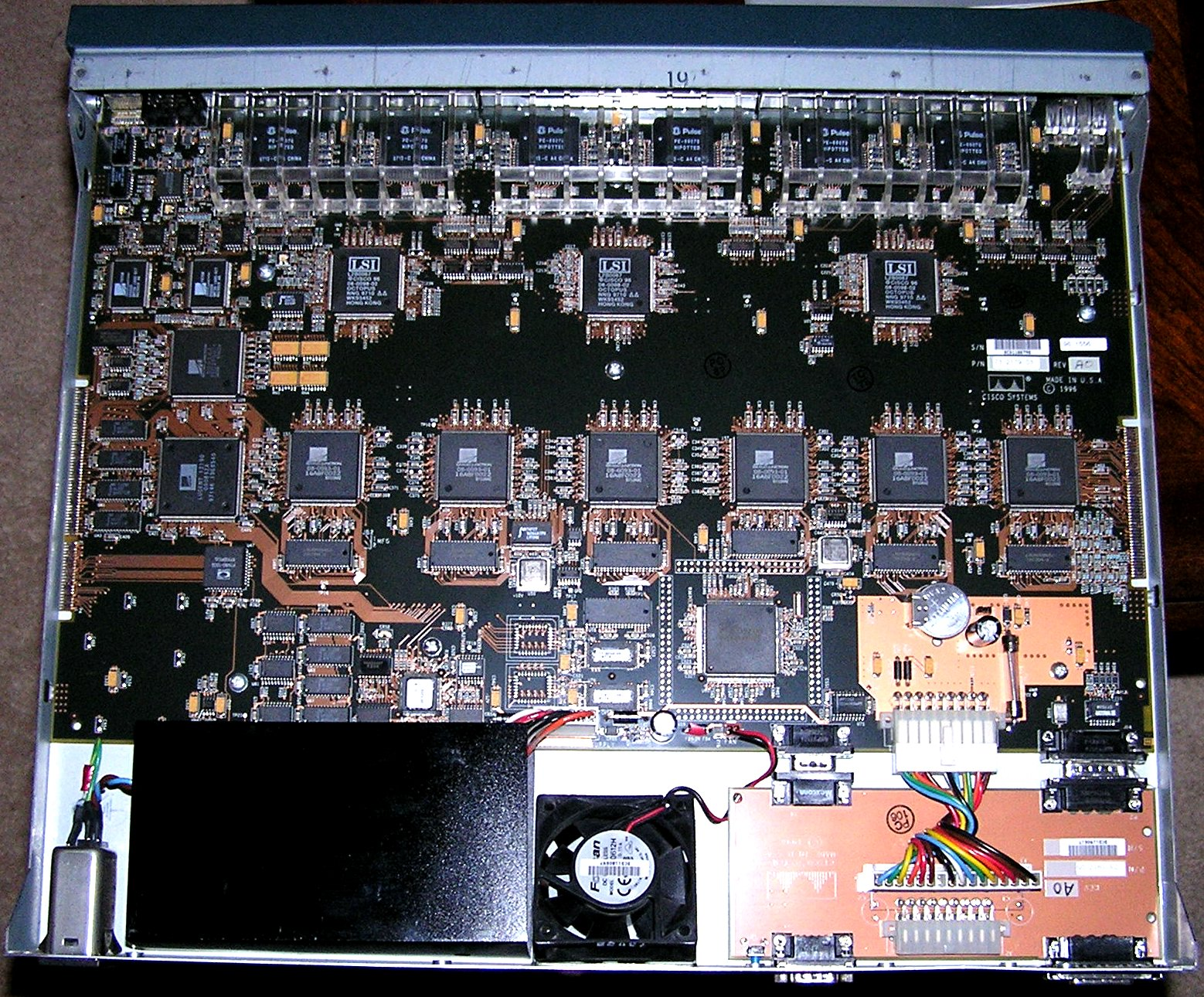
The inside of a Cisco 1900-series switch

Catalyst is the brand for a variety of network switches, wireless controllers, and wireless access points sold by Cisco Systems. While commonly associated with Ethernet switches, a number of different types of network interfaces have been available throughout the history of the brand. Cisco acquired several different companies and rebranded their products as different versions of the Catalyst product line. The original Catalyst 5000 and 6000 series were based on technology acquired from Crescendo Communications. The 1700, 1900, and 2800 series Catalysts came from Grand Junction Networks, and the Catalyst 3000 series came from Kalpana in 1994.

The newest Catalyst series is the Catalyst 9000 family. The Catalyst 9000 family includes switches, wireless access points, and wireless controllers.

== Operating systems ==
In most cases, the technology for the Catalyst Switch was developed separately from Cisco's router technology. The Catalyst switches originally ran software called Catalyst Operating System (CatOS) rather than the more widely known Cisco IOS software used by routers. However, this has changed as the product lines have merged closer together. In some cases, particularly in the modular chassis switches, a configuration called hybrid has emerged - this is where the layer 2 functions are configured using CatOS, and the layer 3 elements are configured using Internetwork Operating System (IOS). Native IOS can also be found with newer software versions that have eliminated CatOS entirely in favor of IOS, even on hardware that originally required CatOS.

Some newer Catalyst switch models (with recent versions of the Cisco IOS) also allow web-based management using a graphical interface (GUI) module which is hosted on a HTTP server located on the switch. The Catalyst 2960-L SM Series of switches is an example of a Cisco Catalyst switch that allows this style of GUI via HTTP.

=== Cisco IOS ===
Cisco IOS, formally the Cisco Internetwork Operating System, is a family of network operating systems used on many Cisco Systems network switches, routers, wireless controllers and wireless access points. Earlier, Cisco switches ran CatOS. Cisco IOS is a package of routing, switching, internetworking and telecommunications functions integrated into a multitasking operating system. Although the IOS code base includes a cooperative multitasking kernel, most IOS features have been ported to other kernels such as QNX and Linux for use in Cisco products. Cisco Catalyst products run IOS or a Linux-derived version called Cisco IOS XE. It was originally called XDI by the switching company Crescendo Communications, Inc. Cisco renamed it to CatOS when they acquired Crescendo and later still to Cisco IOS as the operating system was extended to other Cisco products. The newer Catalyst 9000 family uses the Cisco IOS XE operating system.

== Interfaces ==
As Catalyst devices are primarily Ethernet switches, all modern Catalyst models have Ethernet interfaces ranging from 10 Mbit/s to 100 Gbit/s depending on the model. Other models can support T1, E1, and ISDN PRI interfaces to provide connections to the PSTN. Legacy models supported a variety of interfaces, such as Token Ring, FDDI, Asynchronous Transfer Mode and 100BaseVG, but are no longer sold by Cisco Systems.

The front of a Catalyst 3750G switch, with 48 interfaces for Ethernet over twisted pair and four interfaces for Small Form-factor Pluggable transceivers

All models have basic layer 2 functions and are capable of switching Ethernet frames between ports. Commonly found additional features are VLANs, trunking and QoS. The switches, whether IOS or IOS XE, are fully manageable.

Many Catalyst switches that run IOS or IOS XE are also capable of functioning as a router, making them layer 3 devices; when coupled with TCP and UDP filtering, these switches are capable of layer 2-4 operation. Depending on the exact software image, a Catalyst switch that runs IOS or IOS XE may be able to tackle large-scale enterprise routing tasks, using router technologies like OSPF or BGP.

Modular chassis-based Catalyst switching models, like the Catalyst 9400 and 9600 Series, have the concept of field-replaceable supervisor, line cards, power supplies and fans. Mirroring most Cisco router designs, these work by separating the line cards, chassis, and supervisor engine. The chassis provides power and a high-speed backplane, the line cards provide interfaces to the network, and the supervisor engine moves packets, participates in routing protocols, etc. This gives several advantages:

- If a failure occurs, only the failed component needs to be replaced (typically a power supply, fan, line card or supervisor). This means faster turnaround than replacing an entire switch.
- A redundant component may be installed to rapidly recover from component failures.
- A supervisor engine may be upgraded after purchase, increasing performance and adding features without losing any investment in the rest of the switch.

== Management ==
Catalyst switches offer advanced customization and manageability. The switches can be configured using a serial console, telnet or Secure Shell. Simple Network Management Protocol (SNMP) allows monitoring of many states, and measurement of traffic flows. Many devices can also run an HTTP server.

Configuration of the switch is done in plain text and is thus easy to audit. No special tools are required to generate a useful configuration. For sites with more than a few devices, it is useful to set up a Trivial File Transfer Protocol (TFTP) server for storing the configuration files and any IOS images for updating. Complex configurations are best created using a text editor (using a site standard template), putting the file on the TFTP server and copying it to the Cisco device. However, it can be noted that a TFTP server can present its own security problems.

== Stackwise ==
StackWise and Stackwise Virtual previously known as VSS are technologies offered by Cisco Systems that allows some models of Catalyst switches to operate as though they were one switch. One switch from the stack will act as the primary switch. The primary switch will maintain the stack and allows for configuration and monitoring of the whole stack as though one via a single console. This allows for more efficient management and typically provides more bandwidth between individual switches than other uplink technology.

If one switch fails, the remaining switches will continue to operate by bypassing it. If the primary switch fails, another switch in the stack will automatically take over as primary. This feature means greater redundancy, as one switch's failure will not bring about a failure of the entire stack.

As each switch contains the entire configuration for the stack, one of the benefits of this technology is the ability to replace a faulty switch (any—including primary) with a new switch. The stack will configure the new switch on-the-fly to accommodate minimal downtime and reduce maintenance effort and errors.

Stackwise physically connects the switch stack using special stack interconnect cables, typically up to eight switches per stack. StackWise Virtual and VSS allow for the virtual clustering of two chassis together into a single, logical entity without physical interconnect cables.

=== Primary election ===
The primary switch of a stack is elected in the following order:

1. User specified priority in the switch configuration
2. The switch with the most advanced IOS feature set enabled
3. Programmed switch – A configured switch will preside over a switch running factory defaults
4. Uptime – The switch that has been running the longest
5. MAC address – The switch with the lowest MAC address

== Models ==
There are two general types of Catalyst switches: fixed configuration models that are usually one or two rack units in size, with 12 to 80 ports; and modular switches in which virtually every component, from the CPU card to power supplies to switch cards, are individually installed in a chassis.

In general, switch model designations start with WS-C or C, followed by the model line (e.g. C9600). A letter at the end of this number signifies a special feature, followed by the number of ports (usually 24 or 48) and additional nomenclature indicating other features like UPOE (e.g. C9300-48U). Catalyst 9000 switches also include software subscription license indicators (e.g. C9200-48T-P, E for Essentials, A for Advantage and P for Premier)

=== Fixed-configuration switches ===
Cisco Catalyst 9500 Series
Layer 2 and layer 3 stackable core switches.
Cisco Catalyst 9300 Series
Layer 2 and layer 3 stackable access and distribution switches.
Cisco Catalyst 9200 Series
Layer 2 and layer 3 stackable access switches.
Cisco Catalyst 1000 Series
Layer 2 stackable access switches.
Cisco Catalyst 3850 series
Layer 2 and layer 3 stackable access and distribution switches.
Cisco Catalyst 3650 series
Layer 2 and layer 3 switches with optional stacking capability.
Cisco Catalyst 2960-X/XR Series
Layer 2 and layer 3 stackable access switches.
Cisco Catalyst 2960-L Series
Layer 2 and layer 3 access switches.
Cisco Catalyst 3560CX/2960CX Series
Compact, fanless layer 2 and layer 3 switches.
Cisco Catalyst Digital Building Series
Compact, fanless layer 2 and layer 3 switches.

=== Modular switches ===
Cisco modular switches offer a configurable selection of chassis, power supplies, line cards and supervisor modules. Among Cisco's modular series are:

- The Cisco Catalyst 9600 Series is a modular chassis-based core switch family. This series can support interfaces up to 100 Gigabit Ethernet in speed and redundant supervisor modules, power supplies and fans.
- The Cisco Catalyst 9400 Series is a chassis-based access and distribution switch family. This series can support interfaces up to 40 Gigabit Ethernet in speed and redundant supervisor modules, power supplies and fans.
- The Cisco Catalyst 6800 Series is a chassis-based switch family. This series can support interfaces up to 40 Gigabit Ethernet in speed and redundant supervisor modules.
- The Cisco Catalyst 6500 Series is a chassis-based switch family. This series can support interfaces up to 40 Gigabit Ethernet in speed and redundant supervisor modules.
- The Cisco Catalyst 4500 Series is a mid-range modular chassis network switch. The system comprises a chassis, power supplies, one or two supervisors, line cards and service modules. The Series includes the E-Series chassis and the Classic chassis which is manufactured in four sizes: ten-, seven-, six-, and three-slot.

== End-of-life switches ==
Base Model	Form Factor	Variants	Available ports/Modules	Number of power supplies	Number/Type of supervisors	Expansion type	Sync	End-of-life (only major notices listed)	Comments
Catalyst 2940	Fixed	2940	8 8P8C/1 8P8C; 8 8P8C/1 8P8C or 1 SFP	1 (fixed)	None	None	None	Announced 2009	
Catalyst 2900	Fixed	2918; 2926; 2948; 2980	24 8P8C; 48 8P8C		None	None	None	Announced 2007 (all except 2918), Announced 2015 (2918 only)	
Catalyst 2950	Fixed	2950; 2950SX	12 8P8C; 24 8P8C; 24 8P8C/2 GBIC or 1000SX; 48 8P8C/2 GBIC or 1000SX	1 (fixed)	None	None	None	Announced 2007	Optional Gigastack modules
Catalyst 2960	Fixed	2960; 2960S; 2960CX; 2960-X; 2960-XR	8 8P8C/2 SFP; 24 8P8C/2 SFP; 48 8P8C/4 SFP; 24 8P8C/2 SFP+ 48 8P8C/2 SFP+	1 (fixed) (*note: cannot stack power, only backplane)	None	None	Stack (up to four 2960-S, up to 8 2960-X or 2960XR)	Announced 2013 (2960 only) Announced 2020 (remainder including 2960-X & 2960-XR)	PoE only available on models with P designator, 2960C is compact version
Catalyst 3550	Fixed	3550	24 8P8C/2 GBIC; 48 8P8C/2 GBIC	1 (fixed)	None	None	None	Announced 2005	PoE optional, optional Gigastack modules
Catalyst 3560	Fixed	3560; 3560V2; 3560E; 3560C	8 8P8C/2 SFP or 8P8C; 12 8P8C/2 SFP or 8P8C; 8 SFP; 12 SFP; 24 8P8C/2 SFP; 48 8P8C/4 SFP; 12 X2; 12 SFP/2 X2	1 (up to 2 on 3560E only)	None	None (10 Gbit/s options on 3560E only)	Stack (V2 and E only)	Announced 2012 (all except 3560C)	PoE optional, 3560C is compact version
Catalyst 3750	Fixed	3750; 3750V2; 3750G; 3750E; 3750-X	12 SFP; 24 8P8C/2 SFP; 48 8P8C/4 SFP 24/48 8P8C/2 X2 (3750E)	1 (up to 2 on 3750V2)	None	None	All are stack capable	Announced 2010 (3750), Announced 2013 (3750V2)	PoE optional
Catalyst 3750X	Fixed	3750X	12 SFP; 24 8P8C/2 SFP; 48 8P8C/4 SFP	2	None	Uplink module with 1- and 10-Gbit/s options	All are stack capable	Announced 2015	PoE optional
Catalyst 4900M	Fixed	4900M	48 8P8C/4 SFP; 48 8P8C/2 X2; 28 SFP/2 X2	up to 2	None	Various X2 modules	None	Announced 2013 (4900M)	

== Current switches ==
Base Model	Form Factor	Variants	Available ports/Modules	Number of power supplies	Number/Type of supervisors	Expansion type	Sync	End-of-life (only major notices listed)	Comments
Catalyst 3650	Fixed	3650	24 8P8C/4 SFP; 48 8P8C/4 SFP; 24 8P8C/2 SFP+ 48 8P8C/2 SFP+		None	None	Stackwise-160 (requires optional module)		PoE optional
Catalyst 3850	Fixed	3850	12 SFP; 24 8P8C; 48 8P8C; 12 SFP+ 16 SFP+ 24 SFP+ 32 SFP+ 48 SFP+	Up to 2, most capable of stacking power	None	1 Gbit/s, 10 Gbit/s and 40 Gbit/s options on all models	Stackwise-480	Announced 2019	PoE optional
Catalyst 4500	Chassis	4503; 4503-E; 4506; 4506-E; 4507R; 4507R+E; 4507R-E; 4510R; 4510R+E; 4510R-E	24 SFP module 48 SFP module 48 8P8C module	up to 2	4503:1, 4506:1, all else:up to 2 Sup II+, Sup III, Sup IV, Sup V (EoSale), Sup 6-E Sup 7-E, Sup 8-E	Line cards	VSS (with Sup7)	Announced 2010 (non-E line cards), Announced 2010 (non-E chassis), Announced 2012 (Supervisor V), Announced 2014 (Supervisor 6-E, Supervisor 6L-E)	PoE optional (per module)
Catalyst 4500-X	Fixed	4500-X	16 SFP+ 32 SFP+	up to 2	None	8 SFP+ module	None	Announced 2019	Can select front to back or back to front air flow options
Catalyst 6500-E	Chassis	6503-E; 6504-E; 6506-E; 6509-E/V-E; 6513-E	4 port, 8 port, 16 port, 24 port and 48 port modules in 10/100/1G/10G/40G speeds of various physical medium	up to 2	6503:1, all else:up to 2 Sup 2T, Sup 720 VSS, Sup 720, Sup 32 (EoSale)	Line cards, Firewall, Wireless, Network Analysis (NAM), VPN, Application control engine, ASA Services	VSS (with Sup 720-10G or Sup 2T)	Announced 2012 (Supervisor 32), Announced 2012 (6513 chassis (non-e))	PoE optional (per module)
Catalyst 6800	Both (6840-X and 6800ia models are fixed)	6880-X; 6840-X; 6800-XL; 6800-ia						Announced 2019	Can support some 6500 modules (ASA, NAM, WiSM)
Catalyst 9200	Fixed	9200 9200L	24 port, 48 port, 1 Network Module slot (modular uplinks). 9200L has no modular uplinks, fixed configuration	up to 2 depending on model	None	4 additional SFP/SFP+ ports or 2 25G/40G SFP on network module	Stackwise-160/80 (requires optional module)		PoE and MGig support on various models
Catalyst 9300	Fixed	9300 9300L	24 port, 48 port, 1 Network Module slot. 9300L has no module, fixed configuration	up to 2 depending on model	None	up to 8 additional SFP ports on network module			PoE and MGig support on various models
Catalyst 9400	Chassis	9404R; 9407R; 9410R	24 8P8C module 48 8P8C module 24 SFP module 48 SFP module 24 SFP+ module 48 SFP+ module	9404R: up to 4; 9407R: up to 8; 9410R: up to 8	2 dedicated Supervisor engine slots C9400X-SUP-2XL; C9400X-SUP-2; C9400-SUP-1XL; C9400-SUP-1XL-Y; C9400-SUP-1	Line cards	StackWise Virtual		PoE optional (per module)
Catalyst 9500	Fixed		12, 24, 32, 40, 48 port 1/10/25/40/100 Gbit fixed configuration	Up to 2	None				
