= Cisco Catalyst 6500 =

Network switch

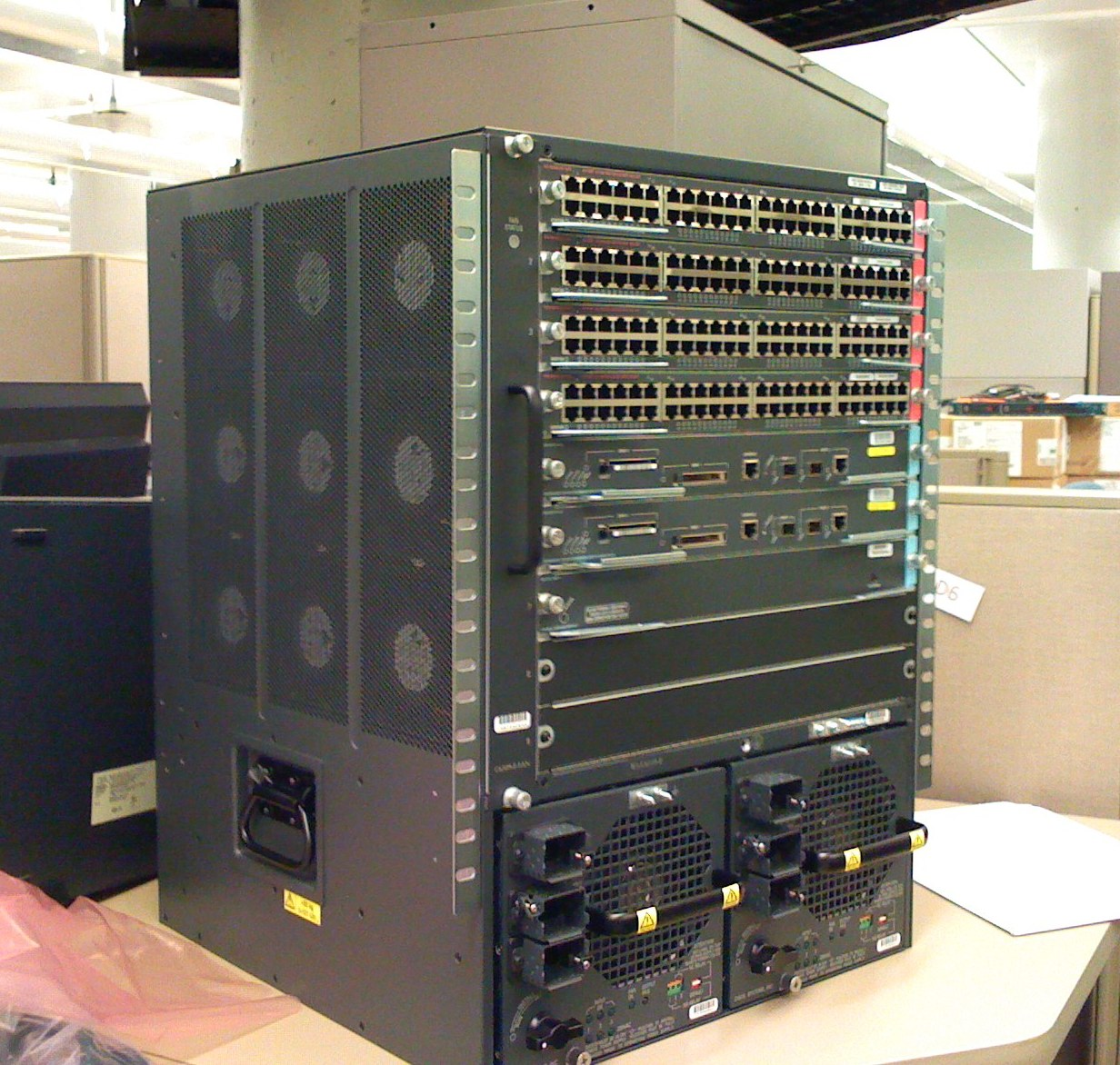
Cisco 6509 switch with four line cards and dual supervisors

The Cisco Catalyst 6500 is a modular chassis network switch manufactured by Cisco Systems from 1999 to 2015, capable of delivering speeds of up to "400 million packets per second".

A 6500 comprises a chassis, power supplies, one or two supervisors, line cards, and service modules. A chassis can have 3, 4, 6, 9, or 13 slots each (Catalyst model 6503, 6504, 6506, 6509, or 6513, respectively) with the option of one or two modular power supplies. The supervisor engine provides centralised forwarding information and processing; up to two of these cards can be installed in a chassis to provide active/standby or stateful failover. The line cards provide port connectivity and service modules to allow for devices such as firewalls to be integrated within the switch.

== Supervisor ==
The 6500 Supervisor comprises a Multilayer Switch Feature Card (MSFC) and a Policy Feature Card (PFC). The MSFC runs all software processes, such as routing protocols. The PFC makes forwarding decisions in hardware.

The supervisor has connections to the switching fabric and classic bus, as well as bootflash for the Cisco IOS software.

The latest generation supervisor is 'Supervisor 2T'. This supervisor was introduced at Cisco Live Las Vegas in July 2011. It provides 80 gigabits per slot on all slots of 6500-E chassis.

== Operating systems ==
The 6500 currently supports three operating systems: CatOS, Native IOS, and Modular IOS.

=== CatOS ===
CatOS is supported for layer 2 (switching) operations only. And, able to perform routing functions (e.g. Layer 3) operations, the switch must be run in hybrid mode. In this case, CatOS runs on the Switch Processor (SP) portion of the Supervisor, and IOS runs on the Route Processor (RP), also known as the MSFC. To make configuration changes, user must then manually switch between the two environments.

CatOS does have some missing functionality, and is generally considered 'obsolete' compared to running a switch in Native Mode.

=== Native IOS ===
Cisco IOS can be run on both the SP and RP. In this instance, the user is unaware of where a command is being executed on the switch, even though technically two IOS images are loaded—one on each processor. This mode is the default shipping mode for Cisco products and enjoys the support of all new features and line cards.

=== Modular IOS ===
Modular IOS is a version of Cisco IOS that employs a modern UNIX-based kernel to overcome some of the limitations of IOS. Additional to this is the ability to perform patching of processes without rebooting the device and in-service upgrades.

== Methods of operation ==
The 6500 has five major modes of operation: Classic, CEF256, dCEF256, CEF720, and dCEF720.

=== Classic Bus ===
The 6500 classic architecture provides 32 Gbit/s centralised forwarding performance. The design is such that an incoming packet is first queued on the line card and then placed on to the global data bus (dBus) and is copied to all other line cards, including the supervisor. The supervisor then looks up the correct egress port, access lists, policing, and any relevant rewrite information on the PFC. It is placed on the result bus (rBus) and sent to all line cards. Those line cards for which the data is not required terminate processing. The others continue forwarding and apply relevant egress queuing.

The speed of the classic bus is 32 gb half duplex (since it is a shared bus) and is the only supported way of connecting a Supervisor 32 engine (or Supervisor 1) to a 6500.

=== CEF256 ===
This method of forwarding, was first introduced with the Supervisor 2 engine. When used in combination with a switch fabric module, each line card has an 8 Gbit/s connection to the switch fabric and additionally a connection to the classic bus. In this mode, assuming all line cards have a switch fabric connection, an ingress packet is queued as before and its headers are sent along the dBus to the supervisor. They are looked up in the PFC (including ACLs etc.), then the result is placed on the rBus. The initial egress line card takes this information and forwards the data to the correct line card along with the switch fabric. The main advantage here is that, there is a dedicated 8 Gbit/s connection between the line cards. The receiving line card queues the egress packet before sending it from the desired port.

The '256' is derived from a chassis using 2 x 8 gb ports on 8 slots of a 6509 chassis: 16 * 8 = 128, 128 * 2 = 256. The number gets doubled because of the switch fabric being 'full duplex'.

=== dCEF256 ===
dCEF256 uses distributed forwarding. These line cards have 2x8 gb connections to the switch fabric and no classic bus connection. Only modules that have a DFC (Distributed Forwarding Card) can use dCEF.

Unlike the previous examples, the line cards hold a full copy of the supervisor's routing tables locally, as well as its L2 adjacency table (i.e. MAC addresses). This eliminates the need for any connection to the classic bus or the requirement to use the shared resource of the supervisor. In this instance, an ingress packet is queued, but its destination is looked up locally. The packet is then sent across the switch fabric and queued in the egress line card before being sent.

=== CEF720 ===
This mode of operation acts identically to CEF256, except with 2x20 gb connections to the switch fabric and there is no need for a switch fabric module (this is now integrated into the supervisor). This was first introduced into the Supervisor Engine 720.

The '720' is derived from a chassis using 2x20 gb ports on 9 slots of a 6509 chassis. 40 * 9 = 360 * 2 = 720. The number is doubled to the switch fabric being 'full duplex'. The reason 9 slots are used for the calculation instead of 8 for the cef256 is that it no longer needs to waste a slot with the switch fabric module.

=== dCEF720 ===
This mode of operation acts identically to dCEF256, except with 2x20 gb connections to the switch fabric.

== Power supplies ==
The 6500 is able to deliver high densities of Power over Ethernet across the chassis. Because of this, power supplies are the key elements of the configuration.

=== Chassis support ===
The following goes through the various 6500 chassis and their supported power supplies & loads.

==== 6503 ====
The original chassis permits up to 2800 W and uses rear-inserted power supplies and differs from the others in the series.

==== 6504-E ====
This chassis permits up to 5000 W (119 A @ 42 V) of power and, like the 6503, uses rear-inserted power supplies.

==== 6506, 6509, 6506-E and 6509-E ====
The original chassis can support up to a maximum of 4000 W (90 A @ 42 V) of power, because of backplane limitations. If a power supply above this is inserted, it will deliver at full power up to this limitation (i.e. a 6000W power supply is supported in these chassis, but will output a maximum of 4000 W).

The 6509-NEB-A supports a maximum of 4500 W (108 A @ 42 V).

With the introduction of the 6506-E and 6509-E series chassis, the maximum power supported has been increased to over 14500 W (350A @ 42V).

==== 6513 ====
This chassis can support a maximum of 8000 W (180 A @ 42 V). However, to obtain this, it must be run in combined mode. Therefore, it is suggested that it would be run in redundant mode to obtain a maximum of 6000 W (145 A @ 42 V).

=== Power redundancy options ===
The 6500 supports dual power supplies for redundancy. These may be run in one of two modes: redundant or combined mode.

==== Redundant mode ====
When running in Redundant mode, each power supply provides approximately 50% of its capacity to the chassis. In the event of a failure, the unaffected power supply will then provide 100% of its capacity and an alert will be generated. As there was enough to power the chassis ahead of time, there is no interruption to service in this configuration. This is also the default and recommended way to configure power supplies.

==== Combined mode ====
In combined mode, each power supply provides approximately 83% of its capacity to the chassis. This allows for greater utilisation of the power supplies and potentially increased PoE densities.

In systems that are equipped with two power supplies, if one power supply fails and the other power supply cannot fully power all of the installed modules, system power management will shut down devices in the following order:

- Power over Ethernet (PoE) devices— The system will power down PoE devices in descending order, starting with the highest numbered port on the module in the highest numbered slot.
- Modules—If additional power savings are needed, the system will power down modules in descending order, starting with the highest numbered slot. Slots containing supervisor engines or Switch Fabric Modules are bypassed and are not powered down.

This shut down order is fixed and cannot be changed.

== Online Insertion & Removal ==
OIR is a feature of the 6500 which allows hot swapping of most line cards without first powering down the chassis. The advantage of this is that one may perform an in-service upgrade. However, before attempting this, it is important to understand the process of OIR and how it may still require a reload.

To prevent bus errors, the chassis has three pins in each slot that correspond with the line card. Upon insertion, the longest of these makes first contact and stalls the bus (to avoid corruption). As the line card is pushed in further, the middle pin makes the data connection. Finally, the shortest pin removes the bus stall and allows the chassis to continue operation.

However, if any part of this operation is skipped, errors will occur (resulting in a stalled bus and ultimately a chassis reload). Common problems include:

- Line cards being inserted incorrectly (thus making contact with only the stall & data pins and thus not releasing the bus)
- Line cards being inserted too quickly (thus the stall removal signal is not received)
- Line cards are being inserted too slowly (thus the bus is stalled for too long & forces a reload).

== See also ==
- Supervisor Engine (Cisco)
