= Cisco IOS XE =

Operating system for network equipment

- Developer: Cisco Systems
- OS family: Unix-like
- Working state: Current
- Source model: Closed source
- Latest release: 26.1.1a / 10 April 2026; 3 months ago
- Supported platforms: Some Cisco routers (such as ASR 1000) and some Catalyst switches (such as 3850)
- Default user interface: Command line interface
- Preceded by: Cisco IOS
- Official website: Cisco IOS XE

IOS XE is a release train of Cisco Systems' widely deployed Internetworking Operating System (IOS), introduced with the ASR 1000 series.

It is built on Linux and provides a distributed software architecture that moves many operating system responsibilities out of the IOS process and has a copy of IOS running as a separate process. Since it runs a copy of IOS, all CLI commands are the same between Cisco IOS and IOS XE, in contrast to IOS XR, which has a completely different code base and whose developers implemented a different CLI command set.

== Releases ==
IOS XE is released separately for ASR 1000 and Catalyst 3850.

== Differences between IOS and IOS XE ==
Cisco IOS is a monolithic operating system running directly on the hardware while IOS XE is a combination of a Linux kernel and a monolithic application (IOSd) that runs on top of this kernel. On the other hand, IOS XR is based on QNX (since version 5.0 it's also based on Linux), where the IOSd application has been separated into many different applications. While IOS XE (IOSd) and IOS share a lot of the same code, IOS XR is a completely different code base.

Since IOS XE has IOSd running as an application on top of Linux, it becomes possible to also run different applications on the hardware, a good example of this is running Wireshark on a switch. Another example is the Cisco IOS XE Open Service Containers.

== See also ==
- Cisco NX-OS
