= Cisco NX-OS =

Network operating system

- Developer: Cisco Systems
- OS family: Unix-like
- Working state: Current
- Source model: Closed source
- Latest release: 10.6(4)M / August 17, 2026; 19 days ago
- Official website: Cisco NX-OS

NX-OS is a network operating system for the Nexus-series Ethernet switches and MDS-series Fibre Channel storage area network switches made by Cisco Systems. It evolved from the Cisco operating system SAN-OS, originally developed for its MDS switches. Cisco is responsible for its development and maintenance.

The command-line interface of NX-OS is similar to that of Cisco IOS.

== Development ==
Cisco is responsible for development and maintenance of NX-OS.

== Core features ==
- System Manager (sysmgr)
- Persistent Storage Service (PSS)
- Message & Transaction Services (MTS)

== Additional features ==
- Fibre Channel and FICON
- FCIP
- FCoE (Nexus 5000/7000 linecards)
- iSCSI
- IPsec
- Scheduling
- NPIV NX Port ID Virtualization
- Inter–VSAN Routing
- VSAN
- Zoning (Hard zoning)
- Callhome
- Cisco Fabric Services (distributed configuration)
- SSH and Telnet
- Storage Media Encryption
- Port Channels
- Cisco Data Mobility Manager
- Fibre Channel Write Acceleration

== Switches running NX-OS ==
- Nexus B22 (HP, Dell, Fujitsu)
- Nexus 9000 series
- Nexus 7700 series
- Nexus 7000 series
- Nexus 6000 series
- Nexus 5000 series
- Nexus 4000 (for IBM BladeCenter)
- Nexus 2000 series
- Nexus 3000
- Nexus 1000V
- MDS 9700 FC Directors
- MDS 9500 FC Directors
- MDS 9250i FC Switch
- MDS 9222i FC Switch
- MDS 9100 FC Switches

== Differences between IOS and NX-OS ==
- NX-OS does not support the login command to switch users.
- NX-OS does not distinguish between standard or extended access lists, all lists are named and "extended" in functionality.
- NX-OS did not support scp server prior to 5.1(1) release.
- In NX-OS, there is no "write" command to save the configuration like on IOS (one uses the "copy" command, instead). Instead, command aliases can be created to provide the "write" command.
- When accessing NX-OS, users authenticate directly to their assigned privilege level.
- SSH server is enabled while Telnet server is disabled by default in NX-OS.

== Releases ==
4.1, 4.2, 5.0, 5.1, 5.2, 6.0, 6.1, 6.2, 7.0, 9.2, 9.3, 10.1

== See also ==
- Cisco IOS
- Cisco IOS XE
- Cisco IOS XR
