= Cisco IOS XR =

- Developer: Cisco Systems
- OS family: Unix-like
- Working state: Current
- Source model: Closed source
- Latest release: 26.2.1 / June 7, 2026; 2 months ago
- Supported platforms: NCS 5x0, NCS 5x00, 8000, ASR 9000 and XRv 9000 Series Routers
- Userland: Linux
- Official website: Cisco IOS XR

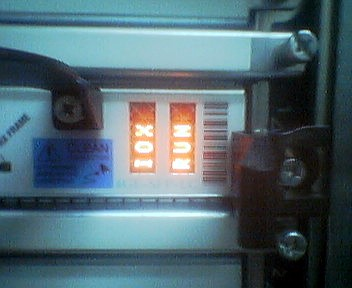
Line card running IOS XR.

IOS XR is a release train of Cisco Systems' widely deployed Internetwork Operating System (IOS), used on their high-end Network Convergence System (NCS) and carrier-grade routers such as the ASR 9000 series and Carrier Routing System series of routers.

== Architecture ==
According to Cisco's product literature, IOS XR shares very little infrastructure with the other IOS trains, and is instead built upon a "preemptive, memory protected, multitasking, microkernel-based operating system". The microkernel was formerly provided by QNX; versions 6.0 up to 7.5.2 use the Wind River Linux distribution. From version 7.6.1 and onwards, the kernel has been switched to OpenEmbedded.

IOS XR aims to provide the following advantages over the earlier IOS trains:

- Improved high availability (largely through support for hardware redundancy and fault containment methods such as protected memory spaces for individual processes and process restartability)
- Better scalability for large hardware configurations (through a distributed software infrastructure and a two-stage forwarding architecture)
- A package based software distribution model (allowing optional features such as multicast routing and MPLS to be installed and removed while the router is in service)
- The ability to install package upgrades and patches (potentially while the router remains in service)
- A web-based GUI for system management (making use of a generic, XML management interface)

== History ==
IOS XR was announced along with the CRS-1 in May 2004. The first generally available version was 2.0.

Some significant releases include the following.

- 3.2 – first generally available version for the 12000 router series
- 3.9 – first generally available version for the ASR 9000 router series
- 5.0 – first generally available version for the NCS6000 series, which is based upon a Linux kernel instead of QNX, and was released in September 2013
- 6.1.1 - Introduces support for the 64-bit Linux-based IOS XR operating system on ASR 9000 series

== Differences between IOS and IOS XR ==
An example BGP configuration for IOS and IOS XR is shown.

More examples can be found in the Cisco document Converting Cisco IOS Configurations to Cisco IOS XR Configurations.

IOS

router bgp 109
  no synchronization
  bgp log-neighbor-changes
  neighbor 203.0.113.1 remote-as 109
  neighbor 203.0.113.1 update-source Loopback0
  no auto-summary

IOS XR

router bgp 109
  neighbor 203.0.113.1
    remote-as 109
    update-source Loopback0

== See also ==
- Cisco IOS
- Cisco IOS XE
- Cisco NX-OS
