= Marine Corps Career Retention Specialist =

The Marine Corps Career Counselor is an enlisted Marine who is responsible to the immediate Commanding Officer for all aspects of retention of enlisted personnel in the United States Marine Corps.

== Military occupational specialty designators ==
The current military occupational specialty (MOS) designator for Career Counselor is 4821. This MOS designator has been changed a couple of times in the first decade of the 21st century and was formerly 0143 and 8421 before that.

== Other titles ==
Other titles for the Career Retention Specialist include Career Planner or as the acronym CRS. A derogatory term for the unit Career Retention Specialist is Career Jammer, or just Jammer.

== Title change ==
As of May 11, 2010, the Career Retention Specialist title was officially changed to "Career Planner." All official correspondence in relation to MOS 4821, enlisted Career Planning, and designation letters will reflect this title change. The authority for this change is TFRS Message M0099.

== Primary duties ==
The primary duties of the Career Counselor include assisting enlisted Marines with reenlistments, lateral movements, extensions, and special duty assignments such as Recruiting Duty, Drill Instructor Duty, Marine Security Guard, Marine Corps Security Forces, and Marine Combat Instructor. The Career Counselor is responsible for identifying, screening, and interviewing Marines for retention and special duties listed above. A large part of the Career Counselor's job is to advise and counsel Marines on how they can become more competitive for promotion and retention. The Career Counselor is considered an expert on all matters pertaining to enlisted retention in the Marine Corps.

== Publications governing career retention ==
The Career Retention Specialist is guided in the performance of his duties by Marine Corps Order P1040.31: Enlisted Retention and Career Development Manual. Becoming familiar with this Marine Corps publication makes the Career Retention Specialist effective at his work. Marine Corps Order P1326.6D is the Special Duty Assignment Manual and is also heavily utilized by the Career Retention Specialist to screen applicants for special duty assignments.

== Unique characteristics ==
- The Career Retention Specialist is considered a special staff officer within Marine Corps units who works directly with the unit commander.
- The Career Retention Specialist receives Special Duty Assignment Pay, technically called SDA Type I.
- While in garrison, the Career Retention Specialist is encouraged to wear the dress blue delta or dress blue charlie uniform, season appropriate.
- The Career Retention Specialist is responsible to three entities: the Commanding Officer, Headquarters U.S. Marine Corps, and the individual Marine.
- Career Retention Specialist is not an entry level MOS. Marines in this position range from Sergeant through Master Gunnery Sergeant, and must have completed at least one enlistment before selection as a Career Retention Specialist.
- The CRS is the liaison between the command and Headquarters Marine Corps.
- The Career Retention Specialist cannot be assigned additional duties that either require a large amount of their time, or any that would compromise their position in the unit.
- The Career Retention Specialist must be self-motivated and work well on their own since they do not have an Officer in Charge directly overseeing their performance, and most of the time they are the only ones in the unit who hold their MOS designator.

== Formal training ==
The MOS granting school for Career Planners is the Basic Career Planners Course (BCPC) which is a part of Recruiters School, and located at MCRD San Diego, California. It is a seven-week course that familiarizes the Career Planners with many aspects of the job. At this school, the student is normally issued a medium dress blue allowance and after graduation becomes eligible to receive special duty assignment pay. There is also a Collateral Duty Career Planner Course which is significantly shorter than the MOS granting course and is usually conducted by a mobile training team by experienced, senior Career Planners and instructors from BCPC. Orders to attend the seven-week course are issued only by Commandant of the Marine Corps, Manpower Management Enlisted Assignments 6. Formal orders are not necessary for the additional duty course, and can be granted by a Marine's command through permissive temporary assigned duty (PTAD).

== Required office assets ==
Every command is required to provide minimum assets for the Career Retention Specialist to use in the performance of their duties. These assets include: sufficient computer with internet access, color monitor, laser printer, and a scanner. The Career Retention Specialist is also to be assigned to a work space that is private, where conversations cannot easily be overheard, and is conducive to conducting confidential interviews and career counseling.

== Career Retention Specialist Staff Noncommissioned Officers in Charge (SNCOIC) ==
The CRS SNCOIC is usually a Staff Sergeant (in some cases, senior Sergeants) who oversees the work of less senior Career Retention Specialists and provides training for them on a regular basis. The CRS SNCOIC is also responsible for quality control in regards to the work of his subordinates. The CRS SNCOIC is essential in providing guidance to the Career Retention Specialists under them.

== Total Force Retention System ==
The Total Force Retention System is used by the Career Retention Specialist to create requests for Marines desiring retention, special duty assignment, separations pay, among other requests. It is a website that can only be accessed with a username and password. It is also a website where Career Retention Specialists can access messages pertinent to their mission. The Total Force Retention system is commonly referred to by its acronym of "TFRS." Access to this site is governed by Manpower Management Enlisted Assignments (MMEA). It is the link usually used by the Career Retention Specialist to request things on behalf of their unit's Marines. Requests generated by the CRS using TFRS are usually run through a CRS's CRS NCOIC before being submitted to MMEA. In TFRS, the Marine actually submitting the request to MMEA is called the "Designated CRS." The requests generated in TFRS are usually called a "RELM" which stands for Reenlistment, Extension, Lateral Movement, but is not limited to these specific request types. Every RELM has a TFRS authority number which is a combination of letters and numbers.

== Career interviews ==
There are periodic interviews required by Marine Corps order that a Career Retention Specialist must coordinate for every enlisted Marine entrusted to them. These interviews are categorized as either FTAP (First Term Alignment Plan) or STAP (Subsequent Term Alignment Plan). FTAP Marines are the most common interviewees. They have four required interviews: The initial interview conducted by the CRS, the CRS FTAP, the CO FTAP, the CRS EAS, and the CO EAS. The initial interview is mainly to introduce Marines to the process of Career Retention and inform them of how better to be competitive for promotion and retention. The FTAP interview is geared toward developing a recommendation for reenlistment and also guiding the Marine in making a decision to leave the Corps or reenlist. The FTAP is conducted by both the CRS and Commanding Officer. The EAS interview is geared toward ensuring the Marine is ready to transition out of the Marine Corps, or to see if there is still potential for further service. Subsequent Term Alignment Plan interviews are for marines who are on their second or subsequent contracts and there are three that are required: CRS STAP, CRS EAS, CO EAS. Many STAP Marines reenlist prior to requiring any of these interviews. Only the last EAS interview is conducted by the commanding officer for STAP Marines.

== Units requiring a career retention specialist ==
Any battalion-sized unit or larger requires a marine holding the occupational specialty of career retention specialist, that is to say, holding the MOS of 4821. Individual company career planners may be assigned at the command's discretion, but do not have to be formally trained, and do not receive SDA Type II pay, or the medium dress blue allowance and they are mainly there to support the battalion career retention specialist. A squadron is the air wing's equivalent to the battalion. Typically a sergeant or staff sergeant is assigned as the CRS for a battalion or squadron. A battalion usually is much larger than a squadron.

A regiment or the air wing's equivalent of aircraft group requires a career retention specialist, also. This marine is in a leadership position among other career planners and typically has a vast amount of career planning experience. These marines typically range from a staff sergeant up to a master sergeant.

The division or the wing is the next rung in the career planning ladder and the career retention program is usually run by a master sergeant at this level.

After the division or wing, there are major commands such as Marine Forces Pacific, whose career retention specialist is a master gunnery sergeant.

Many career retention specialists are required at Headquarters, U.S. Marine Corps in Quantico, VA who process incoming requests on the Total Force Retention System.

There are a variety of units in the Marine Corps, but the explanation above covers most units' organization.
