= Full documentation loan =

In the United States, full documentation loan refers to a loan where all income and assets are documented. It is typically referred to as a "full doc" loan in the mortgage industry and is a common type of loan used for financing a home purchase.

== Required documentation ==
Below is a list of some of the documents that are commonly required when applying for a full documentation loan.

=== Income verification ===
- Proof of Earnings:
  - W-2 form
  - Recent pay stub
  - Tax returns for the past two years
- Proof of Earnings (if self-employed):
  - Profit and loss statements
  - Tax returns for current year and previous two years
- Any additional income; for example:
  - Social Security
  - Overtime bonus
  - Commission
  - Passive income (interest income)
  - Veteran's Benefits

=== Asset verification ===
- Address of one's bank branch
  - Bank account numbers
  - Checking and savings account statements for the previous 2–3 months
- Savings bonds, stocks or investments and their approximate market values
- Copies of titles to any motor vehicles that are paid in full

=== Debt information ===
- Credit card bills for the past few billing periods
- Other consumer debt; for example:
  - Car Loans
  - Furniture Loans
  - Student Loans
  - Other personal and cosigned installment loans with creditor addresses and phone numbers
- Evidence of mortgage and/or rental payments
- Copies of alimony or child support

=== Information regarding desired purchase ===
- Copy of the Ratified Purchase Contract
- Proof one is committed to the purchase
  - Cancelled deposit check
