= Energy efficient mortgage =

An energy efficient mortgage (EEM or "green mortgage") is a loan product that allows borrowers to reduce their utility bill costs by allowing them to finance the cost of improving the energy-efficiency of the real estate property, at the point of the house purchase or the refinancing of existing housing. In practice, energy efficient mortgages can take the form of a standard mortgage (which includes the cost of house purchase and the renovation) or a second mortgage which covers only the cost of the renovation.

First introduced in 1980, EEMs are currently sponsored by all mortgage programs insured by the U.S. federal government. To date, the popularity of the product has been somewhat limited: The New York Times estimates less than 1% of all U.S. home loans are EEMs.

In the European Union, the Energy Efficient Mortgage Initiative has developed an industry-led label, which is currently being used by 37 banks. its definition requires loans to enable an energy efficiency improvement of at least 30%, which is aligned with the EU Taxonomy of sustainable activities. The European Commission has announced it will consider promoting green loans and green mortgages in the coming months as part of its sustainable finance action plan.

Several studies have found evidence of a correlation between energy efficiency and credit risk, meaning that borrowers of a green mortgages are less likely to fall into insolvency. The banking industry argues that such evidence justifies both a reduction in the interest rate for consumers, but also a reduction in the amount of capital banks have to set aside under prudential regulation, the so-called "green supporting factor". The European Banking Authority is currently studying whether prudential rules should be adjusted to reflect this.

Borrowers who qualify for an EEM usually need to complete a home inspection by an energy rater working off qualification standards created by the U.S. Department of Energy. The results of this energy audit can then be used when applying for an EEM.
