= Cisco 12000 =

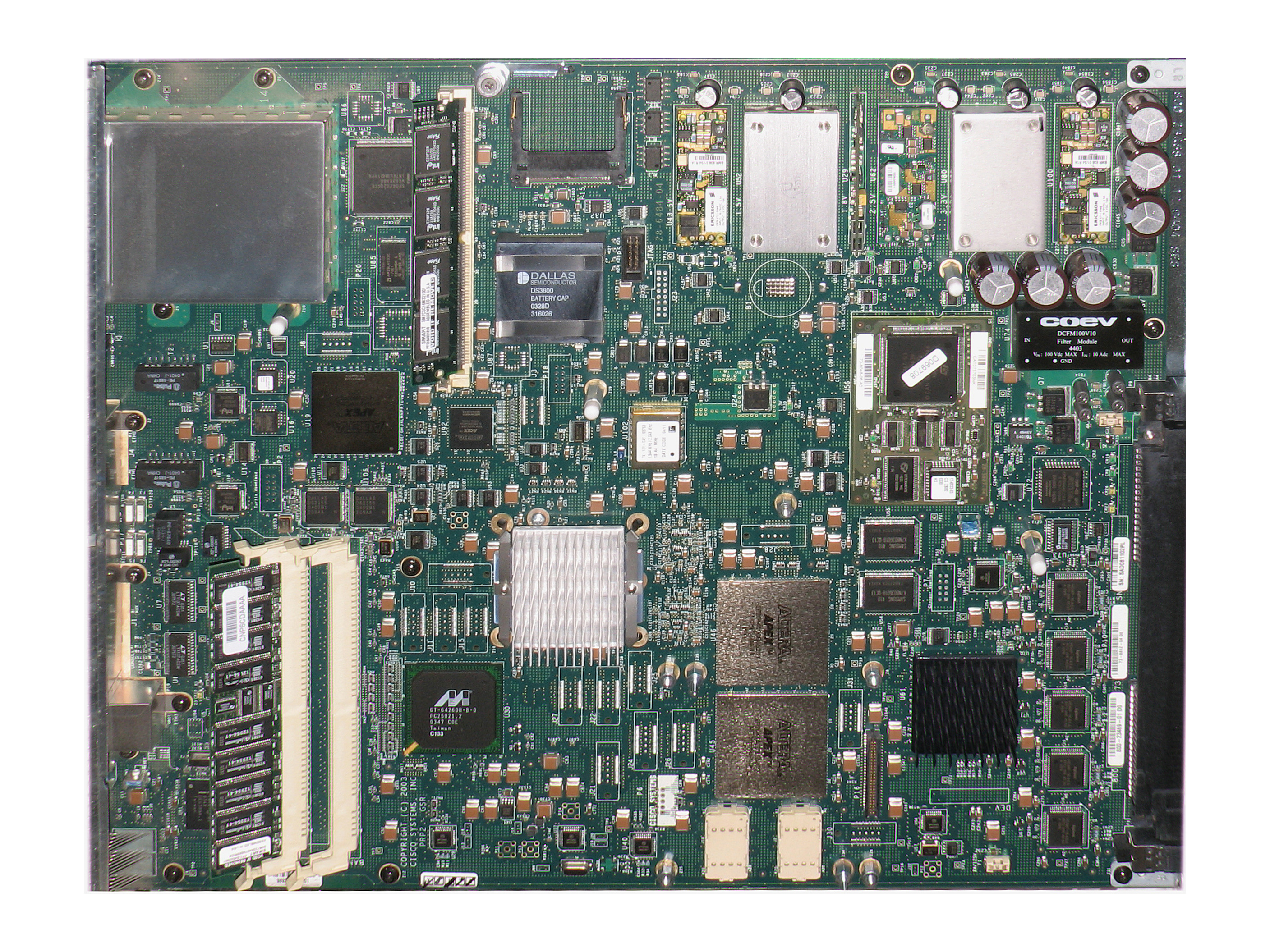
The Performance Route Processor (PRP) is the core of a GSR.

The Cisco 12000, also known as a Gigabit Switch Router or GSR, is a series of large network routers designed and manufactured by Cisco Systems.

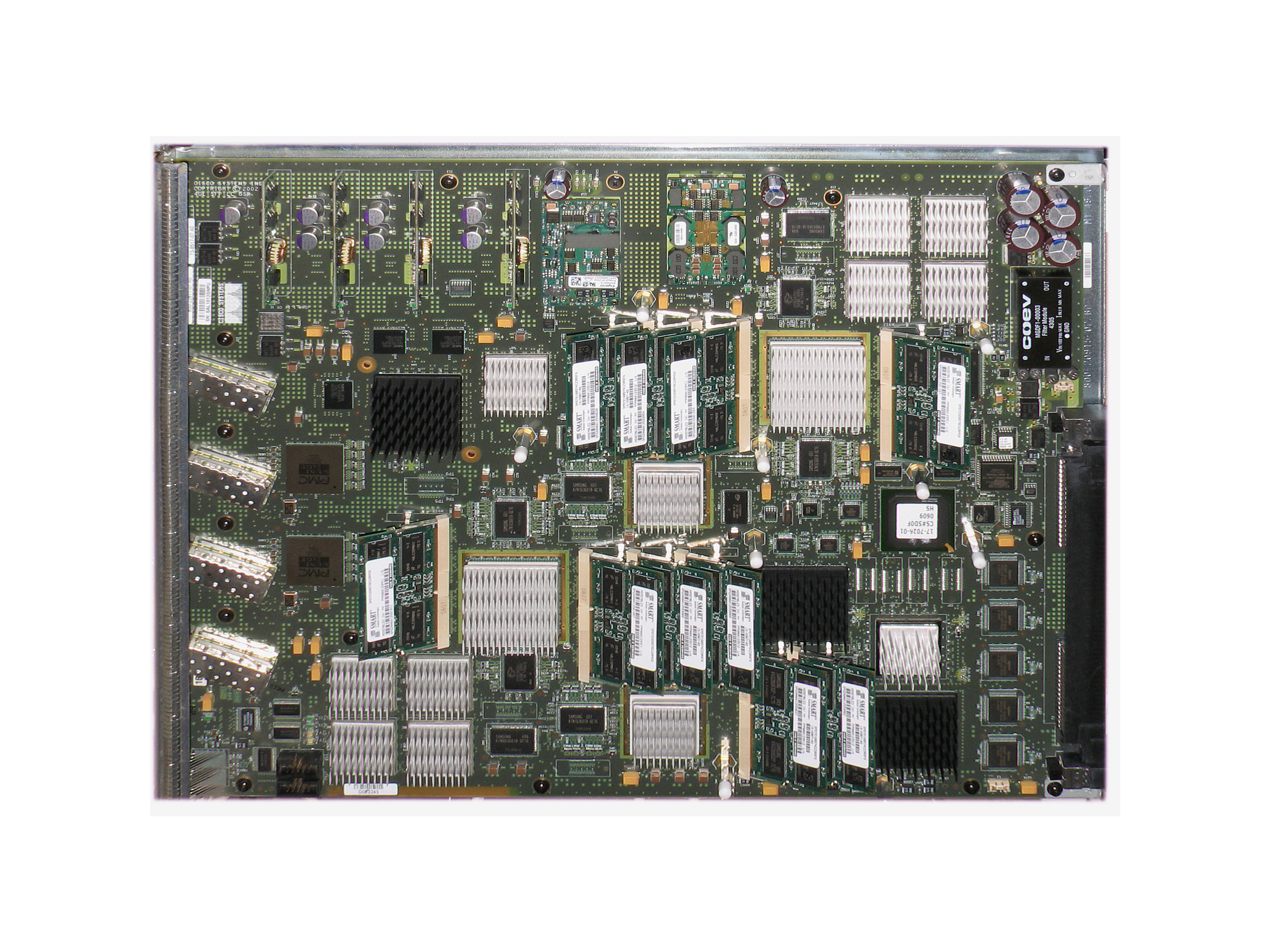
IP Services Engine (ISE) with four Gigabit Ethernet SFPs on the left.

== Features ==
Cisco 12000 series routers feature a high-performance switched backplane providing 2.4 Gbit/s across 16 switched ports simultaneously. The Multi-Service Blade module (introduced for the XR 12000 line) provides firewall and acts as a session border controller.

== Criticism ==
Certain line cards in Cisco 12000 routers are potentially vulnerable to denial-of-service attacks. Additionally, certain software versions were vulnerable to specially crafted IPv4 packets.

== See also ==
- Cisco routers
