= Comparison of user features of operating systems =

Comparison of user features of operating systems refers to a comparison of the general user features of major operating systems in a narrative format. It does not encompass a full exhaustive comparison or description of all technical details of all operating systems. It is a comparison of basic roles and the most prominent features. It also includes the most important features of the operating system's origins, historical development, and role.

== Overview ==
An operating system (OS) is system software that manages computer hardware, software resources, and provides common services for computer programs.

Time-sharing operating systems schedule tasks for efficient use of the system and may also include accounting software for cost allocation of processor time, mass storage, printing, and other resources.

For hardware functions such as input and output and memory allocation, the operating system acts as an intermediary between programs and the computer hardware, although the application code is usually executed directly by the hardware and frequently makes system calls to an OS function or is interrupted by it. Operating systems are found on many devices that contain a computer – from cellular phones and video game consoles to web servers and supercomputers.

As of June 2024, the dominant general-purpose desktop operating system is Microsoft Windows with a market share of around 72.91%. macOS by Apple Inc. is in second place (14.93%), and the varieties of Linux are collectively in third place (4.04%). In the mobile sector, including both smartphones and tablets, Android is dominant with a market share of 71%, followed by Apple's iOS with 28%; for smartphones alone, Android has 72% and iOS has 28%. Linux distributions are dominant in the server and supercomputing sectors. Other specialized classes of operating systems (special-purpose operating systems)), such as embedded and real-time systems, exist for many applications. Security-focused operating systems also exist. Some operating systems have low system requirements (i.e. light-weight Linux distribution). Others may have higher system requirements.

Some operating systems require installation or may come pre-installed with purchased computers (OEM-installation), whereas others may run directly from media (i.e. live cd) or flash memory (i.e. USB stick).

== MS-DOS ==
=== Overview ===
MS-DOS (acronym for Microsoft Disk Operating System) is an operating system for x86-based personal computers mostly developed by Microsoft. Collectively, MS-DOS, its rebranding as IBM PC DOS, and some operating systems attempting to be compatible with MS-DOS, are sometimes referred to as "DOS" (which is also the generic acronym for disk operating system). MS-DOS was the main operating system for IBM PC compatible personal computers during the 1980s, from which point it was gradually superseded by operating systems offering a graphical user interface (GUI), in various generations of the graphical Microsoft Windows operating system.

IBM licensed and re-released it in 1981 as PC DOS 1.0 for use in its PCs. Although MS-DOS and PC DOS were initially developed in parallel by Microsoft and IBM, the two products diverged after twelve years, in 1993, with recognizable differences in compatibility, syntax, and capabilities.

During its lifetime, several competing products were released for the x86 platform, and MS-DOS went through eight versions, until development ceased in 2000. Initially, MS-DOS was targeted at Intel 8086 processors running on computer hardware using floppy disks to store and access not only the operating system, but application software and user data as well. Progressive version releases delivered support for other mass storage media in ever greater sizes and formats, along with added feature support for newer processors and rapidly evolving computer architectures. Ultimately, it was the key product in Microsoft's development from a programming language company to a diverse software development firm, providing the company with essential revenue and marketing resources. It was also the underlying basic operating system on which early versions of Windows ran as a GUI.

== Microsoft Windows ==
=== Overview ===
Microsoft Windows, commonly referred to as Windows, is a group of several proprietary graphical operating system families, all of which are developed and marketed by Microsoft. Each family caters to a certain sector of the computing industry. Active Microsoft Windows families include Windows NT and Windows IoT; these may encompass subfamilies, (e.g. Windows Server or Windows Embedded Compact) (Windows CE). Defunct Microsoft Windows families include Windows 9x, Windows Mobile, and Windows Phone.

Microsoft announced an operating environment named Windows on 10 November 1983, as a graphical operating system shell for MS-DOS in response to the growing interest in graphical user interfaces (GUIs); Windows 1.0 first shipped on 20 November 1985. Microsoft Windows came to dominate the world's personal computer (PC) market with over 90% market share, overtaking Mac OS, which had been introduced in 1984, while Microsoft has in 2020 lost its dominance of the consumer operating system market, with Windows down to 30%, lower than Apple's 31% mobile-only share (65% for desktop operating systems only, i.e. "PCs" vs. Apple's 28% desktop share) in its home market, the US, and 32% globally (77% for desktops), where Google's Android leads.

Apple came to see Windows as an unfair encroachment on their innovation in GUI development as implemented on products such as the Lisa and Macintosh (eventually settled in court in Microsoft's favor in 1993). As of January 2023, on PCs, Windows is still the most popular operating system in all countries. However, in 2014, Microsoft admitted losing the majority of the overall operating system market to Android, because of the massive growth in sales of Android smartphones. In 2014, the number of Windows devices sold was less than 25% that of Android devices sold. This comparison, however, may not be fully relevant, as the two operating systems traditionally target different platforms. Still, numbers for server use of Windows (that are comparable to competitors) show one third market share, similar to that for end user use.

As of October 2020, the most recent version of Windows for PCs, tablets and embedded devices is Windows 10, version 20H2. The most recent version for server computers is Windows Server, version 20H2. A specialized version of Windows also runs on the Xbox One video game console.

=== Windows 95 ===
Windows 95 introduced a redesigned shell based around a desktop metaphor; File shortcuts (also known as shell links) were introduced and the desktop was re-purposed to hold shortcuts to applications, files and folders, reminiscent of Mac OS.

In Windows 3.1 the desktop was used to display icons of running applications. In Windows 95, the currently running applications were displayed as buttons on a taskbar across the bottom of the screen. The taskbar also contained a notification area used to display icons for background applications, a volume control and the current time.

The Start menu, invoked by clicking the "Start" button on the taskbar or by pressing the Windows key, was introduced as an additional means of launching applications or opening documents. While maintaining the program groups used by its predecessor Program Manager, it also displayed applications within cascading sub-menus.

The previous File Manager program was replaced by Windows Explorer and the Explorer-based Control Panel and several other special folders were added such as My Computer, Dial Up Networking, Recycle Bin, Network Neighborhood, My Documents, Recent documents, Fonts, Printers, and My Briefcase among others. AutoRun was introduced for CD drives.

The user interface looked dramatically different from prior versions of Windows, but its design language did not have a special name like Metro, Aqua or Material Design. Internally it was called "the new shell" and later simply "the shell". The subproject within Microsoft to develop the new shell was internally known as "Stimpy".

In 1994, Microsoft designers Mark Malamud and Erik Gavriluk approached Brian Eno to compose music for the Windows 95 project. The result was the six-second start-up music-sound of the Windows 95 operating system, The Microsoft Sound and it was first released as a startup sound in May 1995 on Windows 95 May Test Release build 468.

When released for Windows 95 and Windows NT 4.0, Internet Explorer 4 came with an optional Windows Desktop Update, which modified the shell to provide several additional updates to Windows Explorer, including a Quick Launch toolbar, and new features integrated with Internet Explorer, such as Active Desktop (which allowed Internet content to be displayed directly on the desktop).

Some of the user interface elements introduced in Windows 95, such as the desktop, taskbar, Start menu and Windows Explorer file manager, remained fundamentally unchanged on future versions of Windows.

=== Windows 10 ===
A new iteration of the Start menu is used on the Windows 10 desktop, with a list of places and other options on the left side, and tiles representing applications on the right. The menu can be resized, and expanded into a full-screen display, which is the default option in Tablet mode. A new virtual desktop system was added. A feature known as Task View displays all open windows and allows users to switch between them, or switch between multiple workspaces. Universal apps, which previously could be used only in full screen mode, can now be used in self-contained windows similarly to other programs. Program windows can now be snapped to quadrants of the screen by dragging them to the corner. When a window is snapped to one side of the screen, Task View appears and the user is prompted to choose a second window to fill the unused side of the screen (called "Snap Assist"). Windows' system icons were also changed.

Charms have been removed; their functionality in universal apps is accessed from an App commands menu on their title bar. In its place is Action Center, which displays notifications and settings toggles. It is accessed by clicking an icon in the notification area, or dragging from the right of the screen. Notifications can be synced between multiple devices. The Settings app (formerly PC Settings) was refreshed and now includes more options that were previously exclusive to the desktop Control Panel.

Windows 10 is designed to adapt its user interface based on the type of device being used and available input methods. It offers two separate user interface modes: a user interface optimized for mouse and keyboard, and a "Tablet mode" designed for touchscreens. Users can toggle between these two modes at any time, and Windows can prompt or automatically switch when certain events occur, such as disabling Tablet mode on a tablet if a keyboard or mouse is plugged in, or when a 2-in-1 PC is switched to its laptop state. In Tablet mode, programs default to a maximized view, and the taskbar contains a back button and hides buttons for opened or pinned programs by default; Task View is used instead to switch between programs. The full screen Start menu is used in this mode, similarly to Windows 8, but scrolls vertically instead of horizontally.

== Apple Macintosh ==
=== Apple Classic MacOS ===
==== Overview ====
The classic Mac OS (Note: This is a retronym coined after the introduction of its successor, Mac OS X. It did not have a name until later, as explained below.) (System Software) is the series of operating systems developed for the Macintosh family of personal computers by Apple Inc. from 1984 to 2001, starting with System 1 and ending with Mac OS 9. The Macintosh operating system is credited with having popularized the graphical user interface concept. It was included with every Macintosh that was sold during the era in which it was developed, and many updates to the system software were done in conjunction with the introduction of new Macintosh systems.

Apple released the original Macintosh on 24 January 1984. The first version of the system software, which had no official name, was partially based on the Lisa OS, which Apple previously released for the Lisa computer in 1983. As part of an agreement allowing Xerox to buy shares in Apple at a favorable price, it also used concepts from the Xerox PARC Alto computer, which former Apple CEO Steve Jobs and other Lisa team members had previewed. This operating system consisted of the Macintosh Toolbox ROM and the "System Folder", a set of files that were loaded from disk. The name Macintosh System Software came into use in 1987 with System 5. Apple rebranded the system as Mac OS in 1996, starting officially with version 7.6, due in part to its Macintosh clone program. That program ended after the release of Mac OS 8 in 1997. The last major release of the system was Mac OS 9 in 1999.

Initial versions of the System Software ran one application at a time. With the Macintosh 512K, a system extension called the Switcher was developed to use this additional memory to allow multiple programs to remain loaded. The software of each loaded program used the memory exclusively; only when activated by the Switcher did the program appear, even the Finder's desktop. With the Switcher, the now familiar Clipboard feature allowed cut and paste between the loaded programs across switches including the desktop.

With the introduction of System 5, a cooperative multitasking extension called MultiFinder was added, which allowed content in windows of each program to remain in a layered view over the desktop, and was later integrated into System 7 as part of the operating system along with support for virtual memory. By the mid-1990s, however, contemporary operating systems such as Windows NT, OS/2, and NeXTSTEP had all brought pre-emptive multitasking, protected memory, access controls, and multi-user capabilities to desktop computers, The Macintosh's limited memory management and susceptibility to conflicts among extensions that provide additional functionality, such as networking or support for a particular device, led to significant criticism of the operating system, and was a factor in Apple's declining market share at the time.

After two aborted attempts at creating a successor to the Macintosh System Software called Taligent and Copland, and a four-year development effort spearheaded by Steve Jobs' return to Apple in 1997, Apple replaced Mac OS with a new operating system in 2001 named Mac OS X; the X signifying the underlying Unix system family base shared with Jobs' development of the NeXTSTEP operating systems on the NeXT computer. It retained most of the user interface design elements of the classic Mac OS, and there was some overlap of application frameworks for compatibility, but the two operating systems otherwise have completely different origins and architectures.

The final updates to Mac OS 9 released in 2001 provided interoperability with Mac OS X. The name "Classic" that now signifies the historical Mac OS as a whole is a reference to the Classic Environment, a compatibility layer that helped ease the transition to Mac OS X (now macOS).

=== Apple macOS ===
==== Overview ====
macOS (previously Mac OS X and later OS X) is a series of proprietary graphical operating systems developed and marketed by Apple Inc. since 2001. It is the primary operating system for Apple's Mac computers. Within the market of desktop, laptop and home computers, and by web usage, it is the second most widely used desktop OS, after Microsoft Windows.

macOS is the direct successor to the classic Mac OS, the line of Macintosh operating systems with nine releases from 1984 to 1999. macOS adopted the Unix kernel and inherited technologies developed between 1985 and 1997 at NeXT, the company that Apple co-founder Steve Jobs created after leaving Apple in 1985. Releases from Mac OS X 10.5 Leopard and thereafter are UNIX 03 certified. Apple's mobile operating system, iOS, has been considered a variant of macOS.

Mac OS X 10.0 (code named Cheetah) was the first major release and version of macOS, Apple's desktop and server operating system. Mac OS X 10.0 was released on 24 March 2001 for a price of US$129. It was the successor of the Mac OS X Public Beta and the predecessor of Mac OS X 10.1 (code named Puma).

Mac OS X 10.0 was a radical departure from the classic Mac OS and was Apple's long-awaited answer for a next generation Macintosh operating system. It introduced a brand new code base completely separate from Mac OS 9's as well as all previous Apple operating systems, and had a new Unix-like core, Darwin, which features a new memory management system. Unlike releases of Mac OS X 10.2 to 10.8, the operating system was not externally marketed with the name of a big cat.

==== Apple MacOS Components ====
The Finder is a file browser allowing quick access to all areas of the computer, which has been modified throughout subsequent releases of macOS. Quick Look has been part of the Finder since version 10.5. It allows for dynamic previews of files, including videos and multi-page documents without opening any other applications. Spotlight, a file searching technology which has been integrated into the Finder since version 10.4, allows rapid real-time searches of data files; mail messages; photos; and other information based on item properties (metadata) and/or content. macOS makes use of a Dock, which holds file and folder shortcuts as well as minimized windows.

Apple added Exposé in version 10.3 (called Mission Control since version 10.7), a feature which includes three functions to help accessibility between windows and desktop. Its functions are to instantly display all open windows as thumbnails for easy navigation to different tasks, display all open windows as thumbnails from the current application, and hide all windows to access the desktop. FileVault is optional encryption of the user's files with the 128-bit Advanced Encryption Standard (AES-128).

Features introduced in version 10.4 include Automator, an application designed to create an automatic workflow for different tasks; Dashboard, a full-screen group of small applications called desktop widgets that can be called up and dismissed in one keystroke; and Front Row, a media viewer interface accessed by the Apple Remote. Sync Services allows applications to access a centralized extensible database for various elements of user data, including calendar and contact items. The operating system then managed conflicting edits and data consistency.

All system icons are scalable up to 512×512 pixels as of version 10.5 to accommodate various places where they appear in larger size, including for example the Cover Flow view, a three-dimensional graphical user interface included with iTunes, the Finder, and other Apple products for visually skimming through files and digital media libraries via cover artwork. That version also introduced Spaces, a virtual desktop implementation which enables the user to have more than one desktop and display them in an Exposé-like interface; an automatic backup technology called Time Machine, which allows users to view and restore previous versions of files and application data; and Screen Sharing was built in for the first time.

In more recent releases, Apple has developed support for emoji characters by including the proprietary Apple Color Emoji font. Apple has also connected macOS with social networks such as Twitter and Facebook through the addition of share buttons for content such as pictures and text. Apple has brought several applications and features that originally debuted in iOS, its mobile operating system, to macOS in recent releases, notably the intelligent personal assistant Siri, which was introduced in version 10.12 of macOS.

== Unix and Unix-like systems ==
=== Unix ===
Unix (/ˈjuːnɪks/; trademarked as UNIX) is a family of multitasking, multiuser computer operating systems that derive from the original AT&T Unix, whose development started in the 1970s at the Bell Labs research center by Ken Thompson, Dennis Ritchie, and others.

Initially intended for use inside the Bell System, AT&T licensed Unix to outside parties in the late 1970s, leading to a variety of both academic and commercial Unix variants from vendors including University of California, Berkeley (BSD), Microsoft (Xenix), Sun Microsystems (SunOS/Solaris), HP/HPE (HP-UX), and IBM (AIX). In the early 1990s, AT&T sold its rights in Unix to Novell, which then sold its Unix business to the Santa Cruz Operation (SCO) in 1995. The UNIX trademark passed to The Open Group, an industry consortium founded in 1996, which allows the use of the mark for certified operating systems that comply with the Single UNIX Specification (SUS). However, Novell continues to own the Unix copyrights, which the SCO Group, Inc. v. Novell, Inc. court case (2010) confirmed.

Unix systems are characterized by a modular design that is sometimes called the "Unix philosophy". According to this philosophy, the operating system should provide a set of simple tools, each of which performs a limited, well-defined function. A unified filesystem (the Unix filesystem) and an inter-process communication mechanism known as "pipes" serve as the main means of communication, and a shell scripting and command language (the Unix shell) is used to combine the tools to perform complex workflows.

Unix distinguishes itself from its predecessors as the first portable operating system: almost the entire operating system is written in the C programming language, which allows Unix to operate on numerous platforms.

macOS, described above, is a Unix-like system, and, beginning with Mac OS X Leopard, is certified to comply with the SUS.

=== Linux ===
Linux is a family of open-source Unix-like operating systems based on the Linux kernel, an operating system kernel first released on 17 September 1991, by Linus Torvalds. Linux is typically packaged in a Linux distribution.

Distributions include the Linux kernel and supporting system software and libraries, many of which are provided by the GNU Project. Many Linux distributions use the word "Linux" in their name, but the Free Software Foundation uses the name "GNU/Linux" to emphasize the importance of GNU software, causing some controversy.

Popular Linux distributions include Debian, Fedora, and Ubuntu. Commercial distributions include Red Hat Enterprise Linux and SUSE Linux Enterprise Server. Desktop Linux distributions include a windowing system such as X11 or Wayland, and a desktop environment such as GNOME or KDE Plasma. Distributions intended for servers may omit graphics altogether, or include a solution stack such as LAMP. Because Linux is freely redistributable, anyone may create a distribution for any purpose.

Linux was originally developed for personal computers based on the Intel x86 architecture, but has since been ported to more platforms than any other operating system. Because of the dominance of the Linux-based Android on smartphones, as of January 2023, Linux also has the largest installed base of all general-purpose operating systems. Although it is, as of January 2023, used by only around 2.9 percent of desktop computers, the Chromebook, which runs the Linux kernel-based ChromeOS, dominates the US K–12 education market and represents nearly 20 percent of sub-$300 notebook sales in the US. Linux is the leading operating system on servers (over 96.4% of the top 1 million web servers' operating systems are Linux), leads other large systems such as mainframe computers, and is the only OS used on TOP500 supercomputers (since November 2017, having gradually eliminated all competitors).

Linux also runs on embedded systems, i.e. devices whose operating system is typically built into the firmware and is highly tailored to the system. This includes routers, automation controls, smart home technology (such as Google Nest), televisions (Samsung and LG Smart TVs use Tizen and WebOS, respectively), automobiles (for example, Tesla, Audi, Mercedes-Benz, Hyundai, and Toyota all rely on Linux), digital video recorders, video game consoles, and smartwatches. The Falcon 9's and the Dragon 2's avionics use a customized version of Linux.

Linux is one of the most prominent examples of free and open-source software collaboration. The source code may be used, modified and distributed commercially or non-commercially by anyone under the terms of its respective licenses, such as the GNU General Public License.

90% of all cloud infrastructure is powered by Linux including supercomputers and cloud providers. 74% of smartphones in the world are Linux-based.

==== KDE Plasma 5 ====
KDE Plasma 5 is the fifth and current generation of the graphical workspaces environment created by KDE primarily for Linux systems. KDE Plasma 5 is the successor of KDE Plasma 4 and was first released on 15 July 2014. It includes a new default theme, known as "Breeze", as well as increased convergence across different devices. The graphical interface was fully migrated to QML, which uses OpenGL for hardware acceleration, which resulted in better performance and reduced power consumption.

=== FreeBSD ===
FreeBSD is a free and open-source Unix-like operating system descended from the Berkeley Software Distribution (BSD), which was based on Research Unix. The first version of FreeBSD was released in 1993. In 2005, FreeBSD was the most popular open-source BSD operating system, accounting for more than three-quarters of all installed simply, permissively licensed BSD systems.

FreeBSD has similarities with Linux, with two major differences in scope and licensing. First, FreeBSD maintains a complete system, i.e. the project delivers a kernel, device drivers, userland utilities, and documentation, as opposed to Linux only delivering a kernel and drivers, and relying on third-parties for system software. Second, FreeBSD source code is generally released under a permissive BSD license, as opposed to the copyleft GPL used by Linux.

The FreeBSD project includes a security team overseeing all software shipped in the base distribution. A wide range of additional third-party applications may be installed using the pkg package management system or FreeBSD Ports, or by compiling source code.

Much of FreeBSD's codebase has become an integral part of other operating systems such as Darwin (the basis for macOS, iOS, iPadOS, watchOS, and tvOS), TrueNAS (an open-source NAS/SAN operating system), and the system software for the PlayStation 3 and PlayStation 4 game consoles.

== Google ChromeOS ==
ChromeOS (formerly Chrome OS, sometimes styled as chromeOS) is a Gentoo Linux-based operating system designed by Google. It is derived from the free software ChromiumOS and uses the Google Chrome web browser as its principal user interface. However, ChromeOS is proprietary software.

Google announced the project in July 2009, conceiving it as an operating system in which both applications and user data reside in the cloud: hence ChromeOS primarily runs web applications. Source code and a public demo came that November. The first ChromeOS laptop, known as a Chromebook, arrived in May 2011. Initial Chromebook shipments from Samsung and Acer occurred in July 2011.

ChromeOS has an integrated media player and file manager. It supports Chrome Apps, which resemble native applications, as well as remote access to the desktop. Reception was initially skeptical, with some observers arguing that a browser running on any operating system was functionally equivalent. As more ChromeOS machines have entered the market, the operating system is now seldom evaluated apart from the hardware that runs it.

Android applications started to become available for the operating system in 2014, and in 2016, access to Android apps in Google Play's entirety was introduced on supported ChromeOS devices. Support for a Linux terminal and applications, known as Project Crostini, was released to the stable channel in ChromeOS 69. This was made possible via a lightweight Linux kernel that runs containers inside a virtual machine.

ChromeOS is only available pre-installed on hardware from Google manufacturing partners, but there are unofficial methods that allow it to be installed in other equipment. Its open-source upstream, ChromiumOS, can be compiled from downloaded source code. Early on, Google provided design goals for ChromeOS, but has not otherwise released a technical description.

== See also ==
- Comparison of operating systems
- Hypervisor
- Interruptible operating system
- List of operating systems
- List of pioneers in computer science
- Live CD
- Glossary of operating systems terms
- Microcontroller
- Mobile device
- Mobile operating system
- Network operating system
- Object-oriented operating system
- Operating System Projects
- System Commander
- System image
- Timeline of operating systems
- Usage share of operating systems
