= List of technology terms =

This is an alphabetical list of notable technology terms. It includes terms with notable applications in computing, networking, and other technological fields.

== A ==
- Accelerometer
- ADSL
- Algorithm
- Android
- Apple Inc.
- Archive
- Artificial Intelligence
- ATX
- Automaton

== B ==
- Backup
- Bandwidth
- Benchmark
- Barcode
- Booting or Boot loader
- BIOS
- Bitmap
- Bitcoin
- BitTorrent
- Blacklist
- Blockchain
- Bluetooth
- Binary
- Backlink
- Bloatware
- Broadband Lifecycle
- Bus
- Burn

== C ==
- C
- C++
- C#
- Cache
- Central processing unit
- Client
- Cloud computing
- CMOS
- Compression
- Computer
- Content
- Cookie
- Code
- Coding
- CPU
- Cyber crime
- Cybersecurity

== D ==
- Daemon
- Data
- Database
- Debug
- Determinancy diagramming
- Developer
- Device driver
- Digital subscriber line (DSL)
- Dock
- DOS
- DPI
- Driver
- DRM

== E ==
- Encryption
- Emulator
- Ethernet
- End user
- Encoding
- EXE
- Executable
- Exabyte
- Exbibyte
- Email
- ERP

== F ==
- FAT32
- Firewall
- Firmware
- Framework
- Freeware
- Frictionless sharing
- FTP

== G ==
- GIF
- Git
- GPS
- GSM
- GUI

== H ==
- HDMI
- HTML
- HTTP
- HTTPS
- Hardware
- Headphones

== I ==
- I/O
- IEEE
- Internet
- Internetworking
- Internet Protocol (IP)
- iOS
- IP Address
- International Organization for Standardization (ISO)
- Optical disc image, or ISO image
- International Mobile Equipment Identity (IMEI)
- ISP

== J ==
- Java
- JavaScript
- JPEG
- Joy-Con

== K ==
- Kernel
- Keyboard

== L ==
- Linux
- LTE
- LTE-Sim

== M ==
- Machine
- Macintosh (Mac)
- Malware
- Metrology
- MIDI
- Monotonic query
- MPEG
- MP3
- MP4
- MMS

== N ==
- Newbie
- Network
- Nix
- Non-player character (NPC)

== O ==
- Object-oriented programming (OOP)
- OEM
- OS
- OCR
- OSI (7-layer) model
- Overclock
- Overheat
- Operator
- Operating system

== P ==
- PCI Express
- PDF
- Peer-to-peer
- Phishing
- Python
- Plug-in
- PNG
- Processor
- PSU

== Q ==
- QWERTY
- Quantum computing
- QR Code

== R ==
- Recycle bin
- Remote access
- Registry
- Read-only memory (ROM)
- RAID
- Rooting
- RAM
- Rust (programming language)

== S ==
- Safe mode
- Scalable vector graphics (SVG)
- Search engine
- Search engine optimization
- Secure Sockets Layer (SSL)
- SEO
- Server
- Service pack
- Software
- Source code
- Spam
- SQL
- SSID
- SVGA
- Swype

== T ==
- Technology
- Trash

== U ==
- Underclock
- Unix
- USB

== V ==
- Virus
- Vector graphics
- VGA
- Videotelephony
- VOIP (Voice Over IP)

== W ==
- Web
- WebM
- Wi-Fi and Hotspot (Wi-Fi)
- Windows
- Wireless LAN
- World Wide Web
- WYSIWYG
- WPA

== X ==
- XML

== Y ==
- Y2K
- YouTube

== See also ==
- Glossary of Internet-related terms
- List of computer term etymologies
- List of HTTP status codes
- List of information technology acronyms
- List of operating systems
