= Frictionless =

Frictionless can refer to:

- Frictionless market
- Frictionless continuant
- Frictionless sharing
- Frictionless plane
- Frictionless flow
