= SONiC (operating system) =

Open-source network operating system

- Developer: Microsoft, SONiC Foundation: a part of Linux Foundation, Open Compute Project, and community
- Written in: C
- OS family: Unix-like (Linux kernel)
- Working state: Current
- Source model: Open source
- Initial release: 2016; 10 years ago
- Latest release: SONiC.202505 / 2025/05/31
- Repository: github.com/sonic-net
- Marketing target: Network devices
- Kernel type: Monolithic
- License: Mix of open-source licenses including the GNU GPL and the Apache License
- Official website: sonicfoundation.dev

The Software for Open Networking in the Cloud or alternatively abbreviated and stylized as SONiC, is a free and open source network operating system based on Linux. It was originally developed by Microsoft and the Open Compute Project. In 2022, Microsoft ceded oversight of the project to the Linux Foundation, who will continue to work with the Open Compute Project for continued ecosystem and developer growth. SONiC includes the networking software components necessary for a fully functional L3 device and was designed to meet the requirements of a cloud data center. It allows cloud operators to share the same software stack across hardware from different switch vendors and works on over 100 different platforms. There are multiple companies offering enterprise service and support for SONiC.

== Overview ==
SONiC was developed and open sourced by Microsoft in 2016. The software decouples network software from the underlying hardware and is built on the Switch Abstraction Interface API. It runs on network switches and ASICs from multiple vendors. Notable supported network features include Border Gateway Protocol (BGP), remote direct memory access (RDMA), QoS, and various other Ethernet/IP technologies. Much of the protocol support is provided through inclusion of the FRRouting suite of routing daemons.

The SONiC community includes cloud providers, service providers, and silicon and component suppliers, as well as networking hardware OEMs and ODMs. It has more than 850 members.

The source code is licensed under a mix of open source licenses including the GNU General Public License and the Apache License, and is available on GitHub.
