= ZyNOS =

Operating system used by Zyxel Communications

ZyNOS is the proprietary operating system used on network devices made by Zyxel Communications. The name is a contraction of Zyxel and Network Operating System (NOS).

== History ==
Zyxel first introduced ZyNOS in 1998.

== Versions ==
Zyxel released ZyNOS version 4.0 for their GS2200 series 24 and 48 port ethernet switches in April, 2012. It appears that versions differ between Zyxel products.

== Access methods ==
Web and/or command-line interface (CLI) depending on the device. Web access is accomplished by connecting an Ethernet cable between a PC and an open port on the device and entering the IP address of the device into the Web browser. An RS-232 serial console port is provided on some devices for CLI access, which is accomplished by using SSH or telnet.

== CLI command types ==
Listed below are the categories that the CLI commands are grouped by.

- system-related commands
- exit command
- Ethernet-related commands
- WAN-related commands
- WLAN-related commands
- IP-related commands
- PPP-related commands
- bridge-related commands
- RADIUS-related commands
- 802.1x-related commands
- firewall-related commands
- configuration-related commands
- SMT-related commands.

== Web Configurator ==
The Web Configurator is divided into the following categories:

- basic settings
- advanced application
- IP application
- management

== Security advisories ==
As of January 2014 a ZyNOS ROM-0 vulnerability has been identified. This vulnerability allowed attacker to download router's configuration (ROM-0 file) without any type of authentication required. Such configuration file can be later decompressed to expose router's administrator password, ISP password, wireless password etc.

As of March 2014, Danish computer security company Secunia reports no unpatched advisories or vulnerabilities on ZyNOS version 4.x.

As of March 2014, Secunia reports seven advisories and six vulnerabilities on ZyNOS version 3.x. Five advisories are unpatched; Secunia rates the most severe unpatched advisory as less critical.

As of January 2015, a DNS vulnerability has been found in certain ZyNOS firmware versions. The versions that are affected have not been narrowed down. The attack can be done from a remote location regardless if the user interface is accessible from the outside of a LAN.
