= System Commander =

Hard Disk software, including a partition manager

- Developer(s): VCOM
- Stable release: 9.04
- Operating system: DOS, Windows
- Type: Bootloader
- License: Proprietary
- Website: www.v-com.com/product/System_Commander_Home.html

System Commander (SC for short) is a graphical boot manager/loader software application developed by VCOM. The software allowed for multiple operating systems to be installed onto a machine at once, providing a menu from which the user selected the operating system they wished to boot from. Other software with similar functionality includes NTLDR, LILO, GRUB, and Graphical Boot Manager. One of its components was named Partition Commander.

== Overview ==
System Commander was introduced in 1993 by V Communications, sometimes referred to as VCOM.

== Description ==
A major feature of System Commander is its ability to hide partitions. An operating system could be configured to not recognize other partitions, preventing the data of other installed operating systems from being accessed or tampered with.

System Commander requires either DOS or 32-bit Windows (95/98/Me/2000/XP/2003/Vista) to install.

The software can run in screen resolutions up to 1600x1200.

=== Partition Commander ===
The package also included a partition manager (VCOM's Partition Commander) for creating, resizing and deleting partitions. Partition Commander was not the only software in this market; PartitionMagic was a recognized alternative.

A 2005 review noted that some of the conveniences of Partition Magic, such as walk away and let a series of operations take place; with Partition Commander "you have to wait until each task is complete before initiating the next."

== See also ==
- Glossary of operating systems terms
- Hypervisor
- List of disk partitioning software
- System image
