= LTE-Sim =

LTE-Sim is an open source framework to simulate LTE networks mainly developed by G. Piro and F. Capozzi at "Politecnico di Bari". The simulator was first presented by means of a scientific article.

It encompasses several aspects of LTE networks, including both the Evolved Universal Terrestrial Radio Access (E-UTRAN) and the Evolved Packet System (EPS). It supports single and heterogeneous multi-cell environments, QoS management, multi users environment, user mobility, handover procedures, and frequency reuse techniques. Four kinds of network nodes are modeled: user equipment (UE), evolved Node B (eNB), Home eNB (HeNB), and Mobility Management Entity/Gateway (MME/GW). Four different traffic generators at the application layer have been implemented and the management of data radio bearer is supported. Finally, well-known scheduling strategies (such as Proportional Fair, Modified Largest Weighted Delay First, and Exponential Proportional Fair, Log and Exp rules), AMC scheme, Channel Quality Indicator feedback, frequency reuse techniques, and models for physical layer have been developed.

== See also ==
- https://telematics.poliba.it/LTE-Sim
- http://groups.google.com/group/lte-sim
