= Zyxel =

Taiwanese manufacturer of networking hardware

Zyxel Communications Corporation
- Type: Wholly-owned subsidiaries
- Traded as: TWSE: 3704
- ISIN: TW0003704003
- Industry: Telecommunications
- Founded: 1989; 37 years ago in Hsinchu, Taiwan
- Founder: Dr. Shun-I Chu
- Headquarters: Hsinchu Science Park, Hsinchu, Taiwan
- Area served: Worldwide
- Key people: Shun-I Chu (Founder, Chairman of Zyxel Group Corp.) Gordon Yang (Chairman) Karsten Gewecke (President) Denise Lin (Chief Sustainability Officer)
- Products: 5G NR/4G LTE Fixed Wireless Access CPE, DSL CPE, firewalls, VoIP telephones, modems, mesh networking equipment
- Number of employees: 3690 (as of 2024)
- Parent: Zyxel Group Corp.
- Website: Official website

Zyxel Communications Corporation (/ˈzaɪsɛl/ ZY-sel; Chinese: 合勤科技; pinyin: Héqín Kējì), a subsidiary of Zyxel Group Corporation, is a Taiwanese multinational broadband provider headquartered in the Hsinchu Science Park, Taiwan. The company was founded in 1989 by Shun-I Chu, and has three research centers, four regional headquarters, and 35 branch offices.

The company has a portfolio of mobile and fixed-line broadband access products. In 2020, Zyxel Communications launched WiFi 6 and 5G products.

In 2025, Zyxel announced that it would not release patches for two zero-day vulnerabilities under active attack in its products that—while officially in end-of-life status—were still in use and still available for purchase on Amazon.

== Corporate history ==
- 1988 – Zyxel founder, Dr. Shun-I Chu, starts the business in Taoyuan County, Taiwan in 1988. Dr. Chu rents an apartment in Taoyuan as a lab and starts to develop an analog modem in 1988
- 1989 – Headquarters established at Hsinchu Science Park, Taiwan in 1989
- 1992 – Launches world's 1st Integrated voice/fax/modem
- 1995 – World's 1st Analog/digital ISDN modem
- 2004 – World's 1st ADSL2+ gateway
- 2005 – World's 1st palm-sized portable personal firewall
- 2009 – World's 1st Gigabit active fiber & Telco-grade IPv6 end to end solution
- 2010 – World's 1st Carbon footprint verification on the VDSL2 CPE product
- 2014 – World's 1st UMTS 802.11ac compatible small cell CPE
- 2016 – Garners 14th Consecutive Best Taiwan Global Brands Award
- 2017 – Keenetic has been separated into an independent company for the SOHO and consumer markets.
- 2019 – Zyxel Networks spun off from Zyxel Communications Corp.

== See also ==
- List of companies of Taiwan
- List of networking hardware vendors
- ZyNOS, an operating system used for Zyxel networking devices
