= Broadband Lifecycle =

The Broadband Lifecycle is a model for looking at the planning, implementation, and adoption of broadband networks, providing a framework for understanding the natural progression and sound business planning to drive local economic development through broadband (high-speed Internet networks). It has been utilized by multiple North-American States since 2010.

Developed by Strategic Networks Group in the late 2000s as an alternative means to view broadband deployments, the Broadband Lifecycle is a departure from the dominant economic model of broadband network operators’ that relies on the “supply side” assumption that if a network is built adoption will follow.

Thus, the Broadband Lifecycle considers broadband from a “demand side,” recognizing that adoption and utilization only comes through understanding benefits, supporting the Demand side and the benefits for communities, demonstrating to individual businesses, organizations and households the value of broadband and its transformative effects through Internet enabled applications, which include global market reach, ability to do remote work, use of telemedicine, etc.
