= Glossary of operating systems terms =

This page is a glossary of Operating systems terminology.

== A ==
- access token: In Microsoft Windows operating systems, an access token contains the security credentials for a login session and identifies the user, the user's groups, the user's privileges, and, in some cases, a particular application.

== B ==
- binary semaphore: See semaphore.
- booting: In computing, booting (also known as booting up) is the initial set of operations that a computer performs after electrical power is switched on or when the computer is reset. This can take tens of seconds and typically involves performing a power-on self-test, locating and initializing peripheral devices, and then finding, loading and starting the operating system.

== C ==
- cache: In computer science, a cache is a component that transparently stores data so that future requests for that data can be served faster. The data that is stored within a cache might be values that have been computed earlier or duplicates of original values that are stored elsewhere.
- cloud: Cloud computing operating systems are recent, and were not mentioned in Gagne's 8th Edition (2009). In contrast, by Gagne's 9th (2012), cloud o/s received 3 pages of coverage (41, 42, 716). Doeppner (2011) mentions them (p. 3), but only to prove that operating systems "are not a solved problem" and that even if the day of the dedicated PC is waning, cloud computing has created an entirely new opportunity for o/s development ala sharing, networks, memory, parallelism, etc. Gagne (2012) adds that in addition to numerous traditional o/s's at cloud warehouses, Virtual machine o/s (VMMs), Eucalyptus, Vware, vCloud Director and others are being developed specifically for cloud management with numerous traditional o/s features (security, threads, file and memory management, guis, etc.) (p. 42). Microsoft's investment in cloud aspects of o/s tend to support that argument.
- concurrency

== D ==
- daemon: Operating systems often start daemons at boot time and serve the function of responding to network requests, hardware activity, or other programs by performing some task. Daemons can also configure hardware (like udevd on some Linux systems), run scheduled tasks (like cron), and perform a variety of other tasks.

== K ==
- kernel: In computing, the kernel is a computer program that manages input/output requests from software and translates them into data processing instructions for the central processing unit and other electronic components of a computer. The kernel is a fundamental part of a modern computer's operating system.

== L ==
- lock: In computer science, a lock or mutex (from mutual exclusion) is a synchronization mechanism for enforcing limits on access to a resource in an environment where there are many threads of execution. A lock is designed to enforce a mutual exclusion concurrency control policy.

== M ==
- mutual exclusion: Mutual exclusion is to allow only one process at a time to access the same critical section (a part of code which accesses the critical resource). This helps prevent race conditions.
- mutex: See lock.

== P ==
- paging daemon: See daemon.
- process

== S ==
- semaphore: In computer science, particularly in operating systems, a semaphore is a variable or abstract data type that is used for controlling access, by multiple processes, to a common resource in a parallel programming or a multi user environment.

== T ==
- thread: In computer science, a thread of execution is the smallest sequence of programmed instructions that can be managed independently by an operating system scheduler. The scheduler itself is a light-weight process. The implementation of threads and processes differs from one operating system to another, but in most cases, a thread is contained inside a process.
- templating: In an o/s context, templating refers to creating a single virtual machine image as a guest operating system, then saving it as a tool for multiple running virtual machines (Gagne, 2012, p. 716). The technique is used both in virtualization and cloud computing management, and is common in large server warehouses.

== See also ==
- List of technology terms
- Comparison of operating systems
- List of operating systems
- Timeline of operating systems
