= Interruptible operating system =

An interruptible operating system is an operating system with ability to handle multiple interrupts concurrently, or in other words, which allow interrupts to be interrupted.

Concurrent interrupt handling essentially mean concurrent execution of kernel code and hence induces the additional complexity of concurrency control in accessing kernel datastructures.

It also means that the system can stop any program that is already running, which is a feature on nearly all modern operating systems.

== See also ==
- Operating system
- Operating System Projects
