= Operating System Projects =

Teaching operating system

OSP, an Environment for Operating System Projects, is a teaching operating system designed to provide an environment for an introductory course in operating systems. By selectively omitting specific modules of the operating system and having the students re-implement the missing functionality, an instructor can generate projects that require students to understand fundamental operating system concepts.

The distribution includes the OSP project generator, which can be used to package a project and produce stubs (files that are empty except for required components, and that can be compiled) for the files that the students must implement. OSP includes a simulator that the student code runs on.

== See also ==
- Mobile operating system
- Network operating system
