= Frictionless sharing =

Frictionless sharing refers to the transparent or automatic dissemination of user activity across social media platforms, typically without requiring explicit action from the user each time content is shared. The concept gained prominence in 2011 after Mark Zuckerberg announced a series of new features for Facebook at the F8 developers conference, framing the changes as enabling “real-time serendipity in a friction-less experience.”

== History and concept ==
Before 2011, the term “frictionless sharing” was occasionally used in academic and technical contexts to describe sharing of resources with minimal effort, such as through social bookmarking or Creative Commons licensing to reduce barriers to reuse of research data.

The concept took on a broader cultural meaning when Facebook introduced its Timeline interface and new “social apps” in 2011. These features enabled third-party applications to automatically publish user activity to the platform—effectively shifting sharing from a deliberate act to a passive process. For example, integrating music streaming service Spotify meant that any song a user listened to could automatically appear in a Facebook “Ticker,” allowing friends to see the activity and click through to play the song themselves.

== Zuckerberg’s vision ==
Zuckerberg articulated a vision of a Web in which sharing occurs by default rather than by choice: “You read, you watch, you listen, you buy—and everyone you know will hear all about it on Facebook.” This “frictionless” model assumes ongoing consent after an initial opt-in. Once users connect an app to their profile, any future activity with that app may be automatically shared. This shift from intentional posting to ambient sharing represented a significant evolution in how personal data is distributed online.

== Criticism and debate ==
Many commentators and users have raised concerns about frictionless sharing. While some criticism centers on online privacy, others focus on how automatic updates can flood news feeds and erode the social value of sharing. Critics argue that when sharing becomes automatic, it dilutes the personal curation that makes social media exchanges meaningful. According to Slate, this approach risks “killing taste,” because users typically choose to share only select content they find worth highlighting, rather than everything they consume.

AL.com similarly observed that the frictionless model encourages over-sharing, overwhelming both users and their networks with minor or trivial activities. For example, integrating multiple platforms—such as Twitter, Foursquare, Pinterest, Spotify, and others—can create an incessant stream of updates that some users may find intrusive or irritating. This can lead to what critics describe as “narcissistic” or noisy timelines, potentially undermining the “social” nature of social media.

== Business model and data implications ==
For Facebook, frictionless sharing offers clear business advantages. More frequent and detailed sharing provides valuable data that can be used to refine targeted advertising and personalize content delivery. The model also encourages users to spend more time on the platform, reinforcing its position as a central hub of online social activity.

Other technology companies have experimented with similar approaches. Google has introduced forms of cross-platform integration that facilitate automatic activity sharing, though with a more explicit opt-in structure compared to Facebook. This approach has been described as “friction with consent,” allowing users to manually enable or disable integrations on a per-service basis.
