= List of Cisco products =

Cisco Systems' logo

Cisco Systems' products and services focus upon three market segments—enterprise and service provider, small business and the home.

== Corporate market ==
"Corporate market" refers to enterprise networking and service providers.

Enterprise networks
Products in this category are Cisco's range of routers, switches, wireless systems, security systems, WAN acceleration hardware, energy and building management systems and media aware network equipment.
Collaboration
IP video and phones, TelePresence, HealthPresence, unified communications, call center systems, enterprise social networks and Mobile applications
Datacenter and Virtualization
unified computing, unified fabric, data centre switching, storage networking and cloud computing services.
IP NGN (Next Generation Networks)
High-end routing and switching for fixed and mobile service provider networks, broadcast video contribution/distribution, entitlement and content delivery systems.

Security

Stealthwatch, Identity Services Engine (ISE), Tetration, Adaptive Security Appliance (ASA), Next Generation Firewall (NGFW), Firewall Management Center (FMC), SecureX, Umbrella, CloudLock, Duo, Secure Email, Cisco Cloud Mailbox Defense, Secure Web Appliance, Cloud Secure Email, Secure Email and Web Manager, AnyConnect, Virtual Private Network, Intrusion Detection Prevention System (IDPS), TALOS.

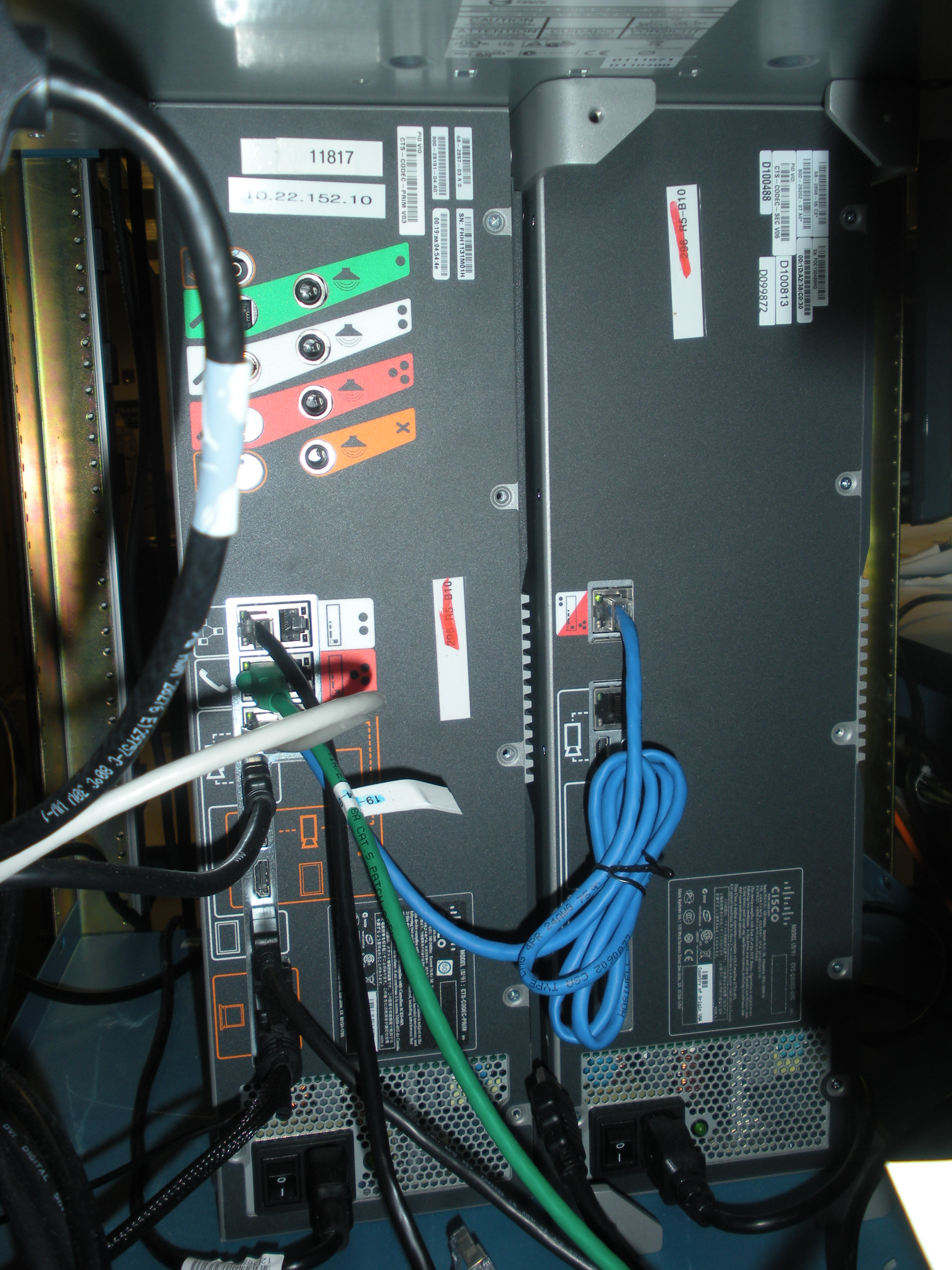
Cisco TelePresence hardware codecs

== Small businesses ==
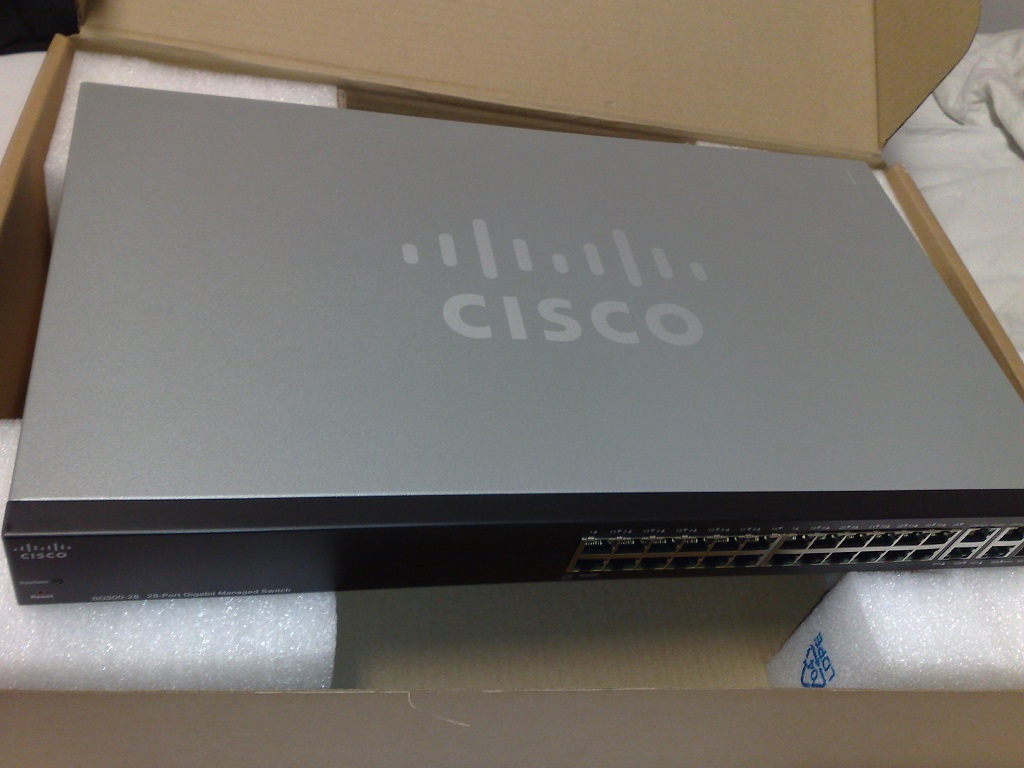
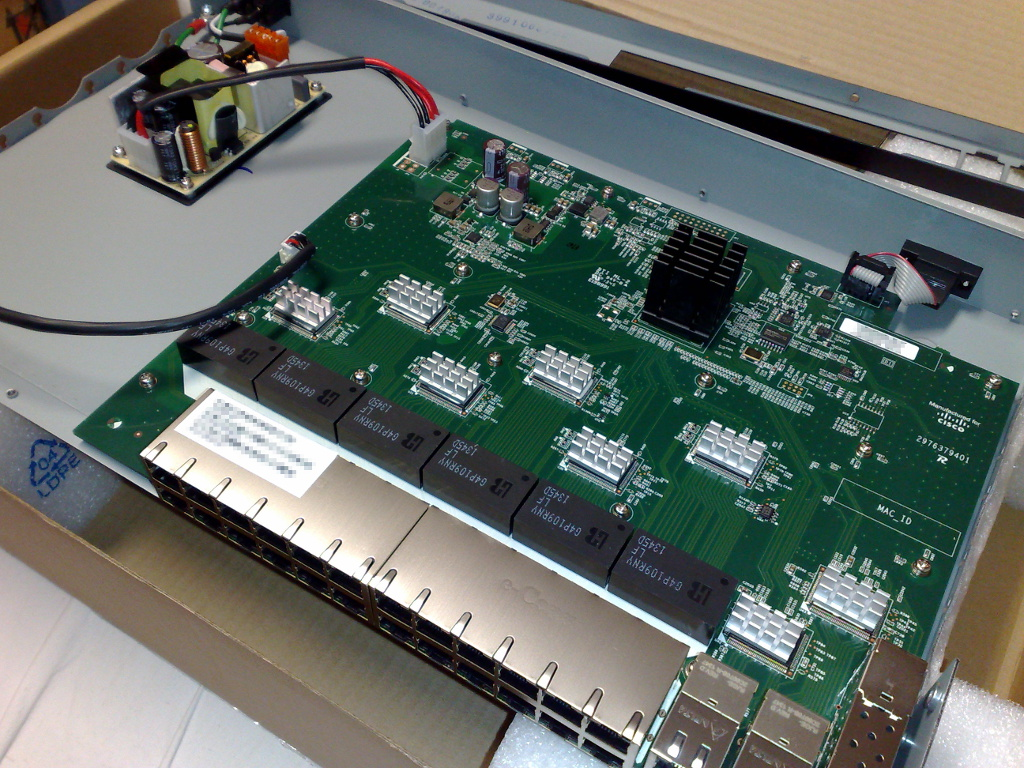
Cisco small business SG300-28 28-port Gigabit Ethernet rackmount switch and its internals

Small businesses include home businesses and (usually technology-based) startups.

Routers and switches
The machines that route and redirect packets across a network, including those for networks of smart meters.
Security and surveillance
IP cameras, data and network security etc.
Voice and conferencing
VOIP phones and gateway-systems, WebEx, video conferencing
Wireless
Indoor Wi-Fi Access points, Wireless Controller
Network storage systems
Persistent people storage on networks, either in the traditional sense or in a cloud-like manner.

== Home user ==
"Home user" refers to individuals or families who require networking services in the home. (Link to cited archived page broken, incorrect, or otherwise nonfunctional)

Broadband
Broadband refers to cable modems.
Flip Video
With the acquisition of Pure Digital Technologies, Cisco began to sell a line of video-recording devices called "Flip Video" that had been Pure Digital's only line of products. This line of products was not as popular as Cisco had thought it would have been, and on April 12, 2011, Cisco announced they were discontinuing all Flip camera production. Cisco's ūmi product line, video conferencing for the home, also proved to be a short-lived bid for the consumer multimedia market and sales were discontinued.

== Hardware ==
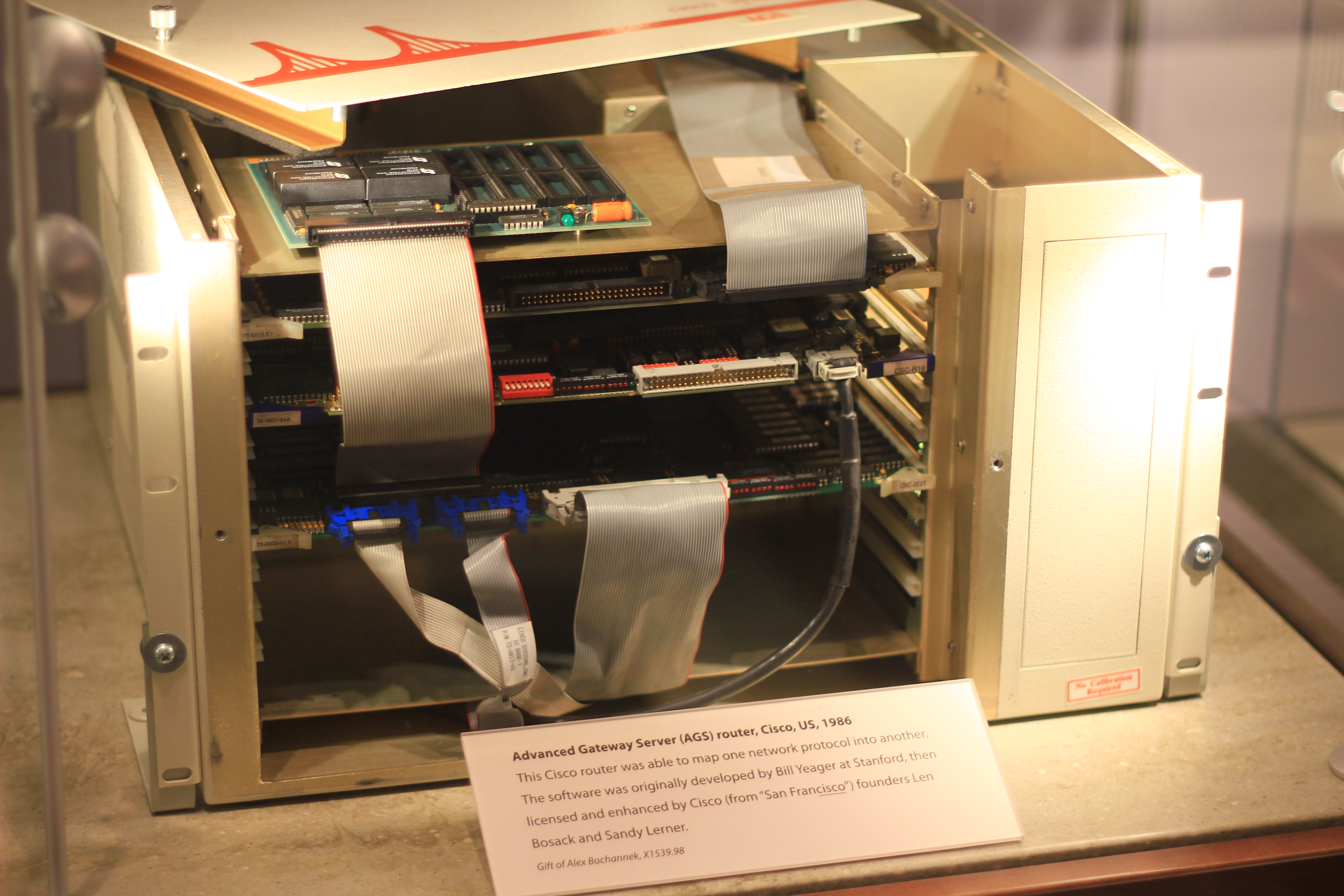
Cisco's first router, the Advanced Gateway Server (AGS) router (1986)

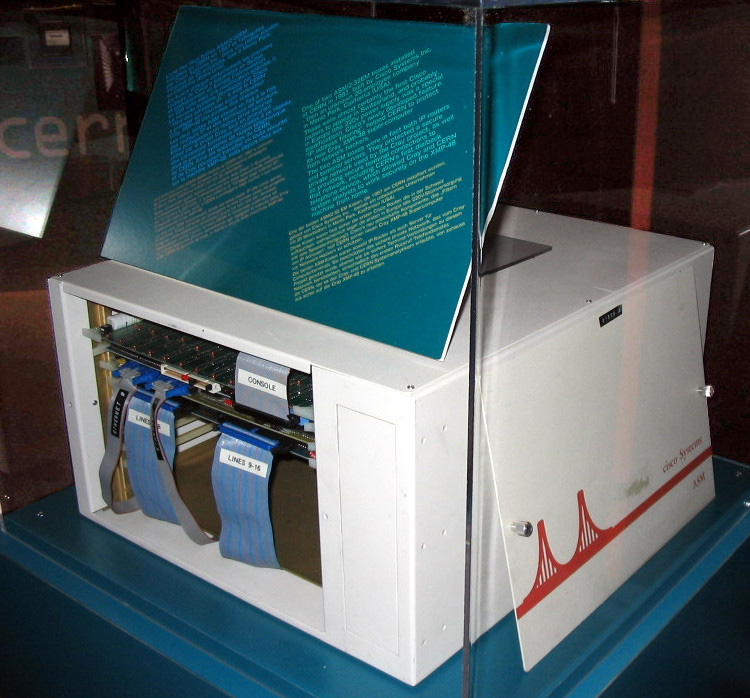
A Cisco ASM/2-32EM router deployed at CERN in 1987

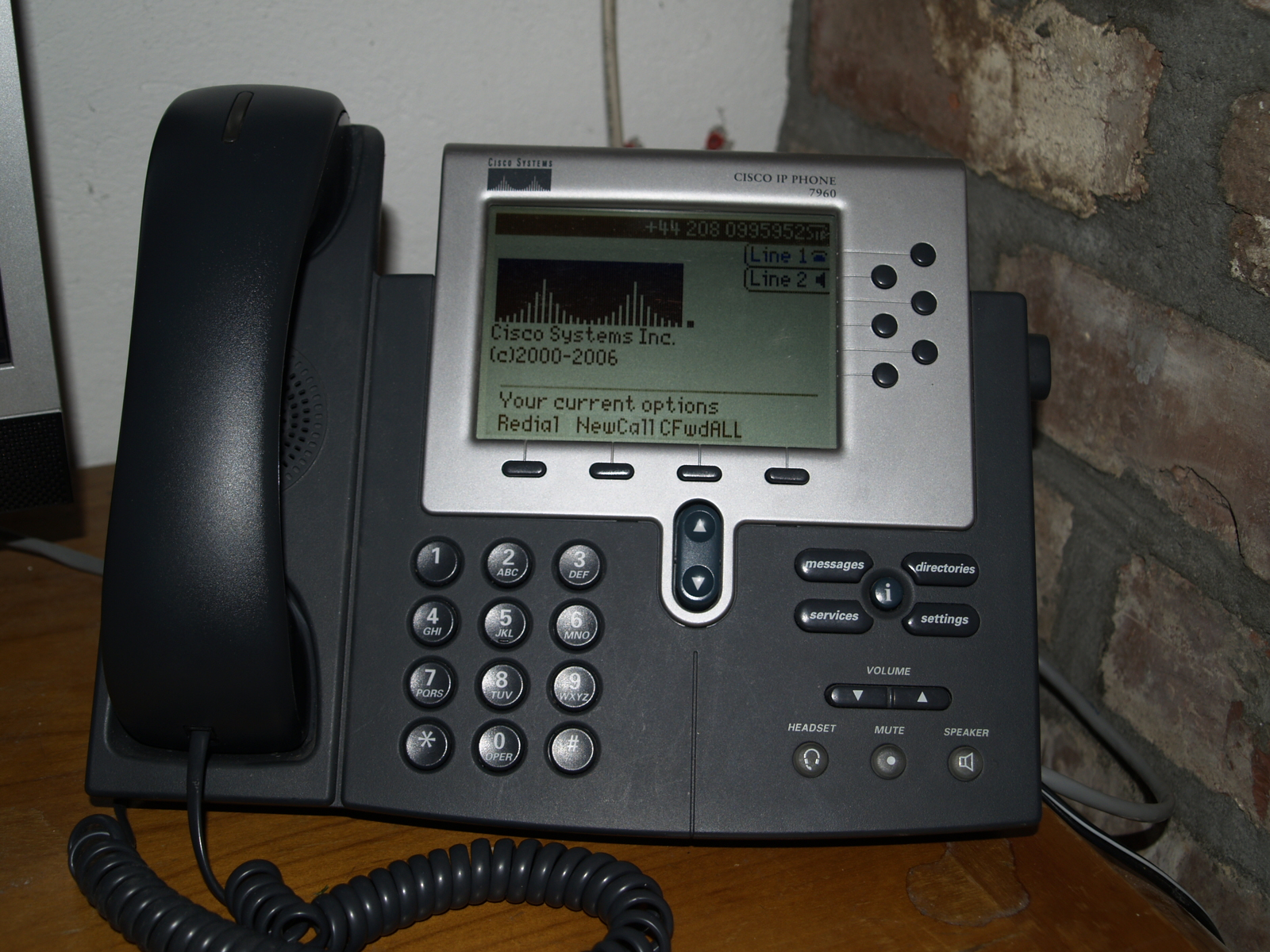
A Cisco 7960G Unified IP phone

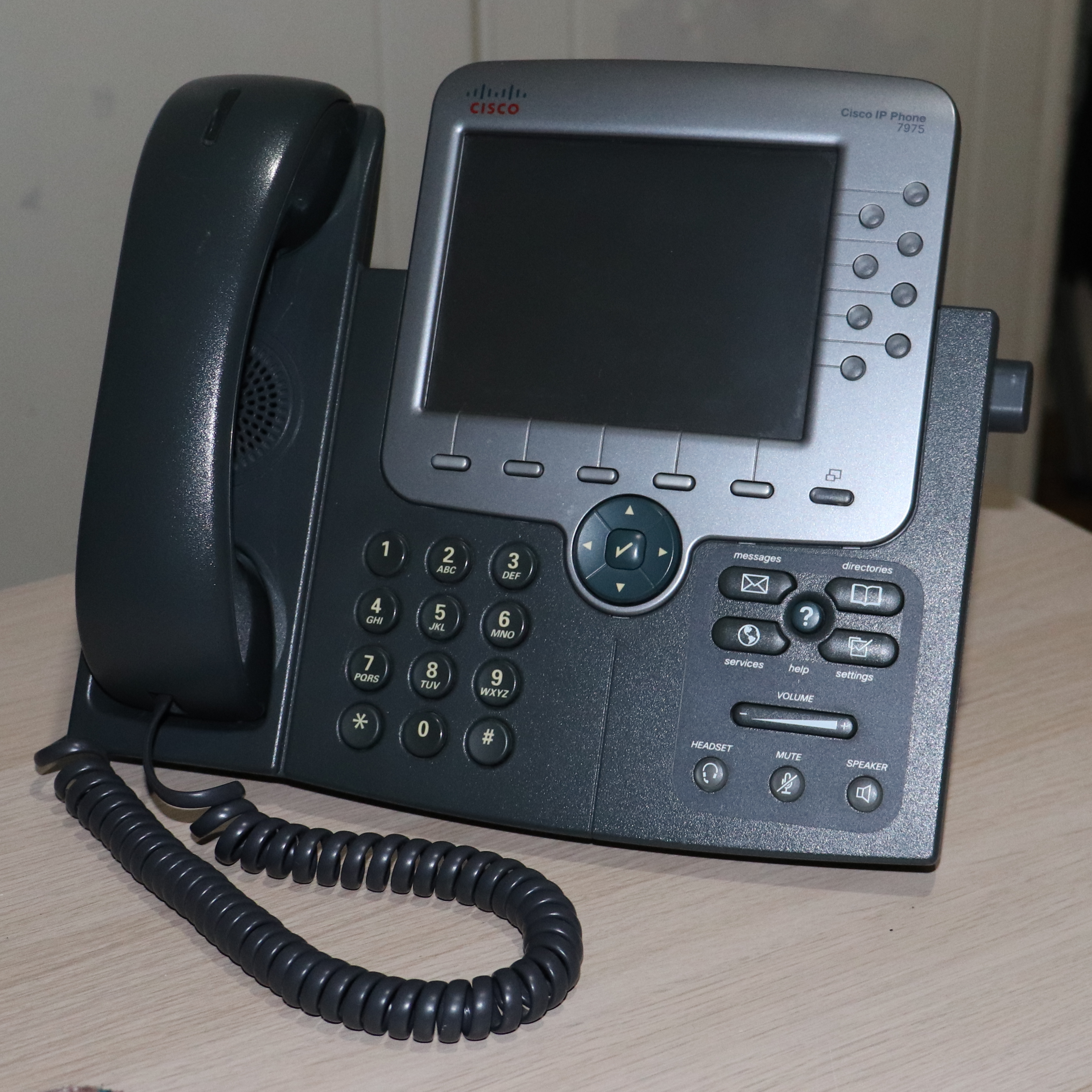
A Cisco 7975 Unified IP Phone

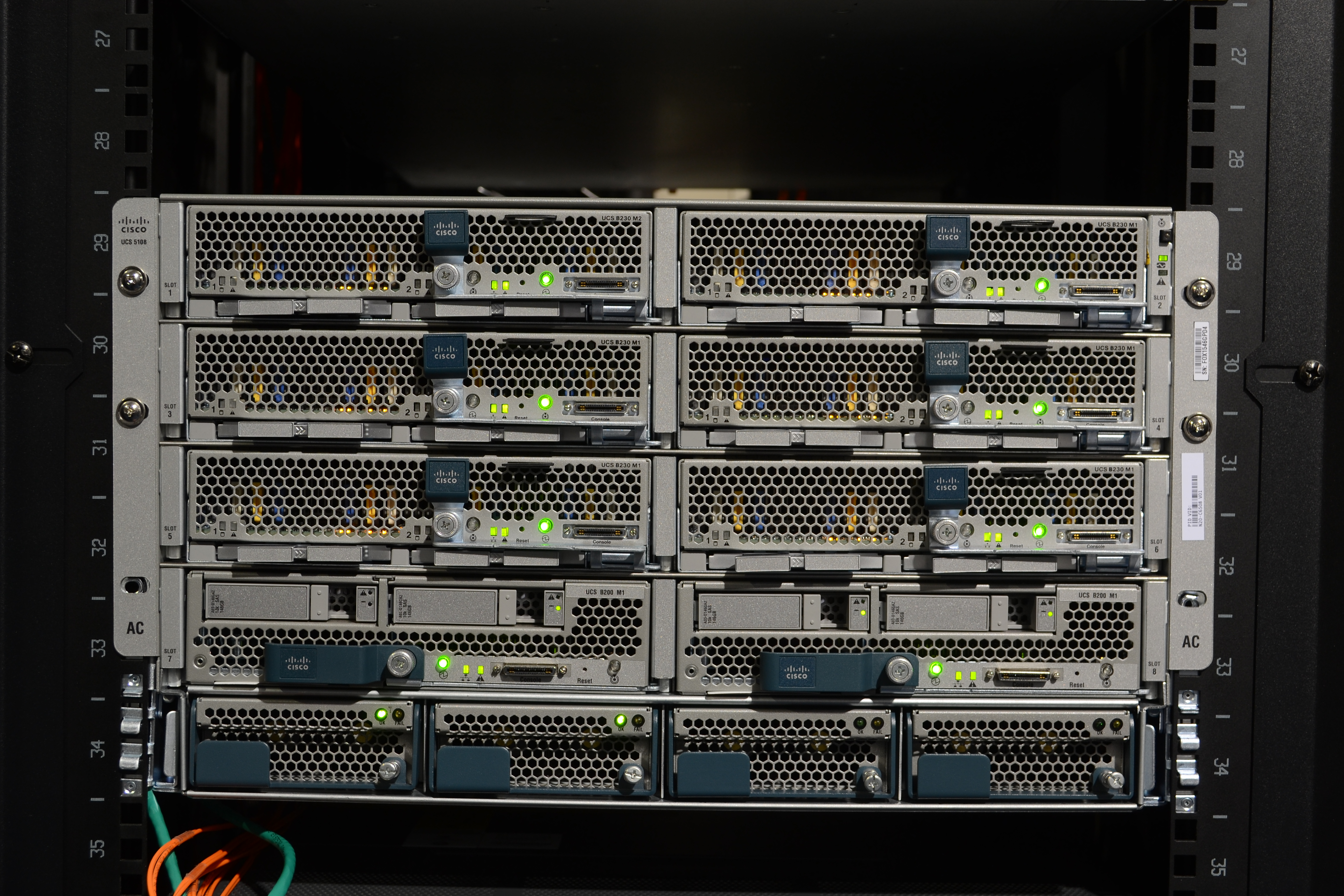
Cisco UCS blade servers

=== Data ===
- Datacenter products: Nexus Switches (1000v, 2000, 3000, 4000, 5000, 6000,7000, 9000), MDS, Unified Computing System (UCS), Application Centric Infrastructure (ACI)
- Routers, including: 800 Series, Integrated Services Router (ISR) (1800, 2800, 3800), ISR G2 (1900, 2900, 3900), 2500 Series, 7200, 7600, 12000, ASR (900, 1000, 9000), Network Convergence System (NCS) 6000, and Carrier Routing System (CRS-1, CRS-3, CRS-X)
- Security appliances: ASA, ASA-X, ASA-CX, ASA with FirePOWER, PIX 500 series, Cisco Security Manager, Email Security Appliance (ESA), Web Security Appliance (WSA), Content Security Management Appliance (SMA)
- Catalyst switches: 1900 Series, 2900 / 2950 / 2960 / 3500XL Series, 3550 / 3750 Series, 3000 Series, Catalyst 4500/4900, 5000/5500 Series, 6500 Series, 6800 Series, 9300/9400/9500 Series
- Teleworker/Remote Connectivity—Cisco LAN2LAN Personal Office for ISDN, VPN 3000 Concentrators
- Cisco Wireless LAN products—Access Points, PCI/PCMCIA/USB Wireless LAN Adaptors, Wireless LAN Controllers (WLC), Wireless LAN Solutions Engines (WLSE), Wireless Control System (WCS), Location Appliances, Long range antennas

=== Telephony products ===
- Collaboration Systems—Cisco TelePresence (Cisco Manufacturing Mobile Video Collaboration with Librestream, Cisco acquired Tandberg, the world leader in Telepresence systems),
- IP Telephony (VoIP), Servers and Appliances
- Cisco Unified IP Phones—Wireless IP Phone 7920, 7945, 7965, 7942, 8900 series, 9900 series, 6900 series

=== Servers / application appliances ===
- Cisco Application Policy Infrastructure Controller (server that controls Application Centric Infrastructure)
- Cisco Wide Area Application Services (WAAS), optimizes the performance of any TCP-based applications
- Unified Computing: Cisco Unified Computing System (UCS), virtual server platform
- Cisco Application Control Engine (ACE): Application Delivery Controller (now discontinued)
- Cisco UCS B-Series Blade Servers (Mini, B460 M4, B420 M4, B260 M4, B200 M4, B480 M5, B200 M5, B200 M6)
- Cisco UCS C-Series Rack Servers (C460 M4, C240 M4, C220 M4, C480 M5, C240 M5, C220 M5),
- Cisco UCS Fabric Interconnects (6200 series, 6300 series, 6400 series)

=== Experimental ===
- CLEO (router) (Cisco Low Earth Orbit router), an Internet router that was integrated into the UK-DMC Disaster Monitoring Constellation satellite
- IRIS (Internet Routing in Space) (Cisco Internet Routing in Space)

=== Other products ===
- Cisco Cius: an Android-based collaboration tablet (now discontinued)
- Set Top Boxes (High Definition PVRs)—Cable/IP
- Flip, pocket camera (Discontinued in April 2011)
- Stanford Massbus Ethernet Interface Subsystem, MEIS (pronounced "maze" or "maize"), the first cisco (later Cisco) product. Developed at Stanford University from 1982 to 1984 by Len Bosack and George Schnurle for PDP-10 computers.

== Software ==
=== Operating systems ===
- IOS
  - IOS XE
- CatOS—Catalyst Switch Operating System
- for Nexus switches:
  - NX-OS
  - ACI-mode switch software (for Application Centric Infrastructure)
- IOS XR
- Starent Operating System (StarOS)
- Cisco Small Business OS (customized version of Linux)

=== VPN/remote connectivity ===
- Cisco AnyConnect Secure Mobility Client, for connecting to virtual private networks (replaces Cisco Systems VPN Client)
- Cisco Systems VPN Client, for connecting to virtual private networks
- Clean Access Agent, Cisco NAC Appliance

=== Telephony/VoIP ===
- Cisco CallManager / Cisco CallManager Express
- Cisco Unified Communications Manager (CUCM) - a large scale contact center solution
- Cisco Unity Connection - Voice messaging system for CUCM.
- Cisco Paging Server (InformaCast) - Paging/bell/mass notification system for CUCM. Originally developed by Singlewire Software, sold as a Cisco product.
- Cisco Unified Communications Manager Express (CUCME) - a small scale/single server contact center solution
- Cisco Unified Operations Manager (CUOM)— a NMS for voice. It features real-time monitoring of all system elements, and performs automatic discovery for the entire system and provides contextual diagnostics for troubleshooting.
- Cisco IP Communicator is a VoIP softphone software application. It can register with a Cisco Unified Communications Manager or Cisco Unified Communications Manager Express using either SIP or Cisco's proprietary Skinny Client Control Protocol.
- Webex, Cloud-based Collaboration Tools

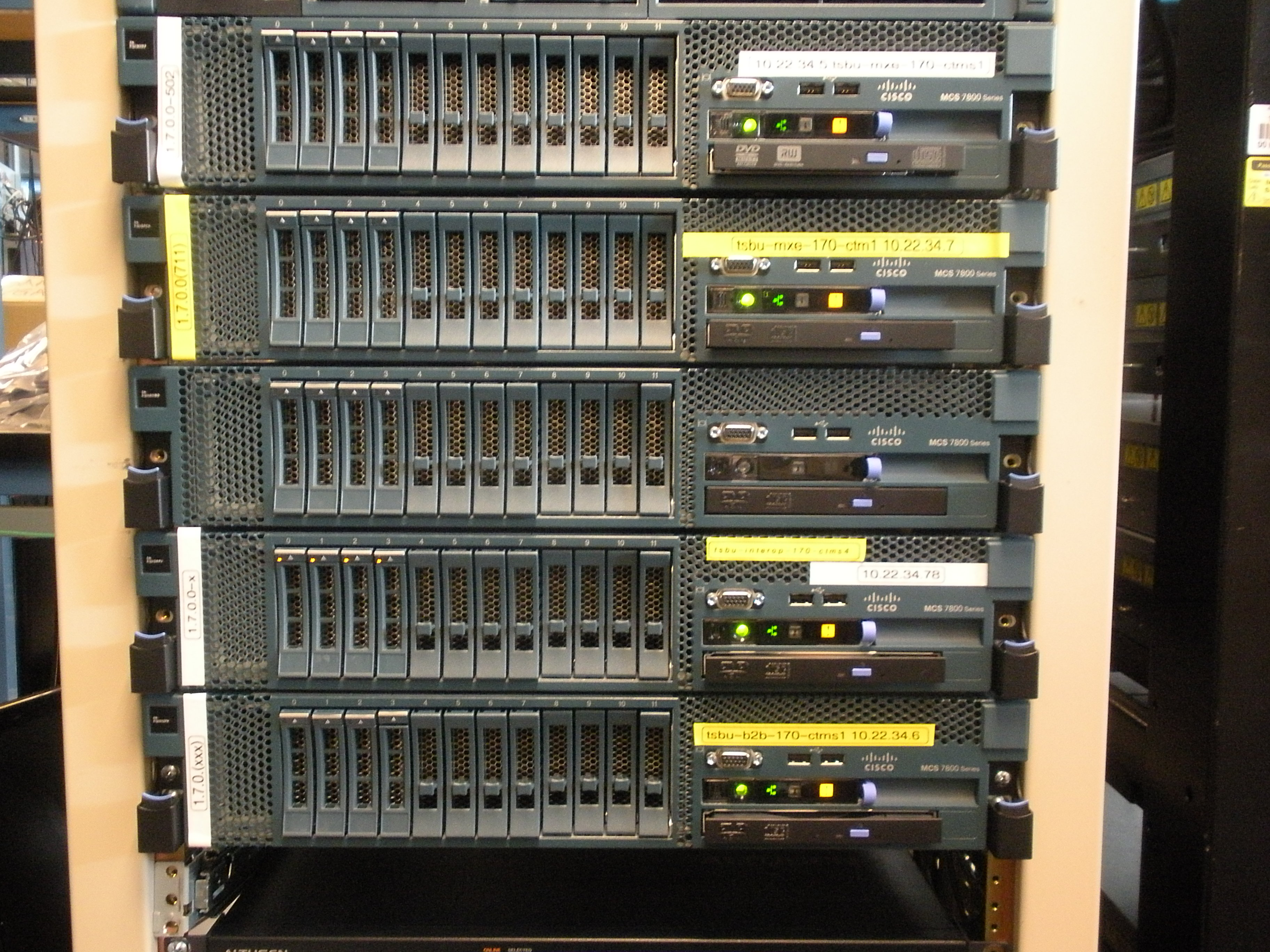
Now-discontinued Media Convergence Servers used to support Cisco Unified Communications systems. They are rebranded IBM System x servers.

=== Other ===
- Cisco Active Network Abstraction
- Cisco Fabric Manager
- Data Center Management and Automation—Cisco Intelligent Automation
- Cisco Tidal Enterprise Scheduler, a job scheduler
- CiscoView
- CiscoWorks Network management, software
- Cisco Eos, a software platform
- Packet Tracer, didactic network simulator
- Cisco Network Magic Pro
- Cisco Security Manager
- Cisco Security Device Manager (SDM)
- Cisco Security Prime Device Manager
- Cisco Prime Infrastructure
- Cisco Adaptive Prime Security Device Manager (for the ASA-CX)
- Cisco Firepower Management Center (for the ASA FirePOWER)
- Cisco IPS Device Manager (for single IPS devices)
- Cisco IPS Manager Express (for multiple IPS devices)
- Cisco Identity Services Engine (ISE)
- Panoptica
- PostOffice protocol (not to be confused with POP3, SMTP, or other mail delivery protocols). It is a Cisco proprietary protocol that runs over UDP on port 45000. It provides a communications vehicle between the sensors and the Director platform.

== VoIP services ==
Cisco became a major provider of Voice over IP to enterprises, and is now moving into the home user market through its acquisitions of Scientific Atlanta and Linksys. Scientific Atlanta provides VoIP equipment to cable service providers such as Time Warner, Cablevision, Rogers Communications, UPC and others; Linksys has partnered with companies such as Skype, Microsoft and Yahoo! to integrate consumer VoIP services with wireless and cordless phones.

=== Hosted collaboration solution (HCS) ===
Cisco partners can offer cloud-based services based on Cisco's virtualized Unified Computing System (UCS). A part of the Cisco Unified Services Delivery Solution that includes hosted versions of Cisco Unified Communications Manager (UCM), Cisco Unified Contact Center, Cisco Unified Mobility, Cisco Unified Presence, Cisco Unity Connection (unified messaging) and Cisco Webex Meeting Center.

== Network emergency response ==
As part of its Corporate Social Responsibility mission, Cisco Tactical Operations (TACOPS) employees and Disaster Incident Response Team (DIRT) volunteers maintain two Network Emergency Response Vehicles (NERV)s. The vehicles are deployed by the TACOPS/DIRT teams during natural disasters and other public crises. The vehicles are self-contained and provide wired and wireless services including voice and radio interoperability, voice over IP, network-based video surveillance and secured high-definition video-conferencing for leaders and first responders in crisis areas with up to 3 Mbit/s of bandwidth (up and down) via a 1.8-meter satellite antenna.

NERVs are based at Cisco headquarters sites in San Jose, California and at Research Triangle Park, North Carolina, allowing strategic deployment in North America. They can become fully operational within 15 minutes of arrival. High-capacity diesel fuel-tanks allow the largest vehicles to run for up to 72 hours continuously. The NERV has been deployed to incidents such as the October 2007 California wildfires; hurricanes Gustav, Ike and Katrina; the 2010 San Bruno gas pipeline explosion, tornado outbreaks in North Carolina and Alabama in 2011; and Hurricane Sandy in 2012. Cisco never charges for TACOPS/DIRT team deployments.

The Tactical Operations team maintains and deploys smaller, more portable communication kits to emergencies outside of North America. In 2010, the team deployed to assist in earthquake recovery in Haiti and in Christchurch (New Zealand). In 2011, they deployed to flooding in Brazil, as well as in response to the 2011 earthquake and tsunami in Japan.

In 2011, Cisco received the Innovation Preparedness award from the American Red Cross Silicon Valley Chapter for its development and use of these vehicles in disasters.

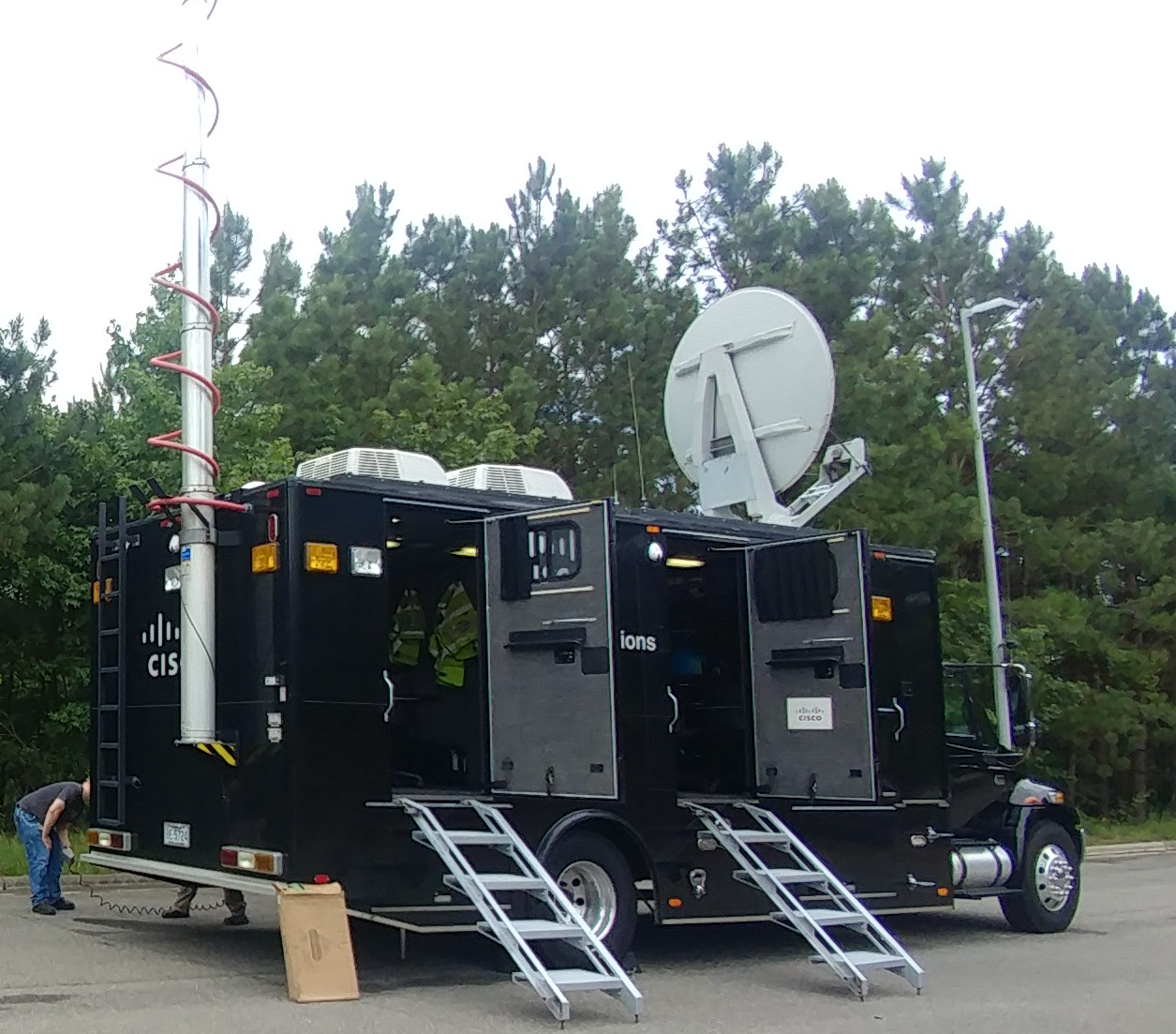
Cisco NERV during a DIRT training exercise in RTP, NC 2019
