= Packeteer =

Defunct IT company

Packeteer, Inc.
- Company type: Public
- Industry: Information technology
- Founded: 1996; 30 years ago in Cupertino, California, United States
- Founder: Robert Packer; Brett Galloway
- Defunct: 2008
- Fate: Acquired by Blue Coat Systems

Packeteer, Inc., founded in 1996 by Robert Packer, Brett Galloway and Bob Luxenberg was an I.T. company based in Cupertino, California that was listed on the NASDAQ. Networking appliances focus on Application Traffic Management and optimization for wide area networks. They held at least 40 patents for various network optimization methods. Packeteer was acquired by Blue Coat Systems in 2008.

Packeteer was a contributing member of the Apdex Alliance.

Their main product lines were:

- PacketShaper (Traffic shaping, compression, TCP & HTTP acceleration, analysis, reporting)
- SkyX (TCP acceleration and compression, high latency link optimization) via the Mentat acquisition.
- iShared (WAFS and TCP acceleration, optimization, compression and caching) via the Tacit Networks acquisition.
- iShaper (Introduced: May 7, 2007. Combines PacketShaper and iShared technologies into a single appliance.
- Mobiliti software (data protection and link optimization for mobile business users. via the Tacit Networks acquisition.
- PolicyCenter (centrally manages the configuration, policy management, software distribution and adaptive response tracking of multi-unit deployments.)

== History ==
- In 1996, Packeteer was founded.
- In 1999, Packeteer had an initial public offering on NASDAQ.
- In 2000, Packeteer acquired the company Workfire Technologies and released its AppCelera product based on the Internet Web Acceleration technology developed by Workfire.
- In 2004, Packeteer acquired the company Mentat, integrating its SkyX product into the Packeteer portfolio.
- In 2006, Packeteer acquired the company Tacit Networks, maker of the iShared and Mobiliti product lines.
- On April 21, 2008, Blue Coat System announced its intention to acquire Packeteer, Inc.
- On June 9, 2008, Packeteer, Inc. was acquired by Blue Coat Systems. which in 2016 was acquired by Symantec

== See also ==
- Traffic shaping
- Bandwidth management
- WAN optimization
- Allot Communications
- NetEqualizer
