= Mobiliti =

Software for Windows by Packeteer

- Developer: Packeteer
- Stable release: 7.1 / April, 2008
- Operating system: Microsoft Windows
- Type: Backup software, File Synchronization, Offline network
- License: Shareware
- Website: http://www.packeteer.com/support/work_pcare_prog_mobiliti.cfm

Mobiliti was a file synchronization, backup and offline network software for Microsoft Windows based systems, developed by Packeteer. It was originally called Network/Unplugged when it was released in 1998 by Mobiliti, Inc. It started as a 3-member team of Kiran Somalwar, Dinesh Sinha and Ram Kishore Dulam. Mobiliti was acquired by Tacit Networks, Inc., which in turn was acquired by Packeteer, Inc. in 2006. Packeteer was in turn acquired by Blue Coat Systems. As of 16 July 2008 Blue Coat no longer offers Mobiliti for sale but support may still be purchased and existing support continues until 16 July 2011 (maintenance releases will be discontinued on 16 July 2010, and contracts may not be renewed after that date).

Mobiliti replicates network files, structure, and the look and feel onto the mobile/remote computer, maintaining a consistent network environment that enables mobile users to work off-line as if they are still connected to their network. It also provides backup functionality that allows local files to be backed up to a network file server. It allows Microsoft Outlook PST files to be easily synched up without crimping user performance or WAN traffic loads. The software uses cached data from network file servers that displays folders and drive mappings as if the user were connected to the enterprise network. The product then applies wide area network (WAN) compression and downsizes network traffic loads between mobile users and the enterprise network, reducing time to synchronization and backup. Mobiliti has a management console that lets administrators create individual user or group profiles, change individual settings and produce a single synchronization report about all users.

Mobiliti came in three editions: Basic, Plus and Enterprise. It was available as shareware and had a trial period of 21 days.

== See also ==
- List of backup software
- WAN optimization
- Personal Folders (.pst) files
- File Synchronization
- CIFS
