= Tacit Networks =

American technology company

Tacit Networks, Inc.
- Company type: Private
- Industry: Information technology
- Founded: 2000; 25 years ago in South Plainfield, New Jersey, United States
- Defunct: 2006
- Fate: Acquired by Packeteer

Tacit Networks, Inc. was an American technology company based in South Plainfield, New Jersey, that developed wide area file services (WAFS) and WAN optimization products for enterprises with distributed and branch-office environments. The company’s main product line, iShared, used caching and protocol-acceleration techniques intended to improve file and application performance over wide area networks. Tacit also expanded into mobile backup and synchronization through its acquisition of Mobiliti in early 2006. It was founded in 2000.

== History ==
Tacit Networks was founded in 2000. The company entered the emerging WAFS market, which aimed to centralize data and IT services while maintaining local-like performance for remote users.

The company raised $7.3 million in its first round of funding in December 2002 and $16.9 million in a second round in 2004, for roughly $24.2 million total at the time of the announcement.

In March 2004, Tacit acquired the intellectual property and patents of AttachStor (Attachsoft), an e-mail attachment management technology that Tacit planned to integrate with its WAN-based file-sharing platform.

In May 2005, Tacit entered a strategic relationship with Brocade that included an OEM/resale component and joint development work for WAFS solutions.

In early 2006, Tacit acquired Mobiliti, adding Windows-based backup, synchronization and offline-access tools for mobile and remote users.

== Products and technology ==
Their product lines were:

- iShared which provides Wide area file services and WAN optimization.
- Mobiliti (via the acquisition of Mobiliti) which provides backup, synchronization and offline access services to mobile users.
- iShared Mini

=== iShared ===
Tacit’s flagship iShared product family provided WAFS and WAN-optimization capabilities for enterprise branch offices. Industry coverage described iShared as a branch-office caching and acceleration platform designed to keep centralized file servers in the data center while delivering improved performance to remote offices.

=== iShared Mini ===
In 2006, Tacit introduced iShared Mini, targeting small offices with up to five users. The entry-level appliance was priced around $4,000 and was marketed as a smaller version of Tacit’s enterprise iShared systems, combining WAN optimization with branch-office services such as file and e-mail acceleration and local caching.

=== Mobiliti ===
Following the acquisition of Mobiliti, Tacit planned to integrate Mobiliti’s client/server software into its broader remote-office strategy, extending backup and synchronization beyond fixed branch locations to mobile workers.

== Acquisitions ==
On January 30, 2004, Tacit Networks acquired the assets of AttachStor. The AttachStor technology provided the basis for the email acceleration feature in the iShared product.

On December 30, 2005, Tacit Networks acquired the assets of Mobiliti and integrated the Mobiliti product line into its portfolio.

On May 15, 2006, Packeteer acquired Tacit Networks and integrated the iShared and Mobiliti product lines into the Packeteer portfolio.

== See also ==
- Wide area file services
- WAN optimization
