= WAFS =

WAFS may refer to:

- Women's Auxiliary Ferrying Squadron
- Wide area file services, a recently coined term for distributed office functions
- WAFS (AM), a radio station (1190 AM) licensed to Atlanta, Georgia, United States
