= CUCM =

CUCM may refer to:

- Cisco Unified Communications Manager, communications product from Cisco
- Master Chief Constructionman, a Seabee occupational rating in the U.S. Navy
