= Internet area network =

Type of large-scale computer network

An Internet area network (IAN) is a concept for a communications network that connects voice and data endpoints within a cloud environment over IP, replacing an existing local area network (LAN), wide area network (WAN) or the public switched telephone network (PSTN).

== Overview ==
An IAN securely connects endpoints through the public Internet to communicate and exchange information and data without being tied to a physical location.

The IAN eliminates a geographic profile for the entire network because the applications and communications services have become virtualized. Endpoints need to be connected only over a broadband connection across the Internet. Unlike IAN, LAN interconnects computers in a limited area, such as a home, a school, a computer laboratory, or an office building. The WAN also differs from the IAN because it is a network that covers a broad area, such as any telecommunications network that links across metropolitan, regional, or national boundaries, using private or public network transports.

Hosted in the cloud by a managed services provider, an IAN platform offers users secure access to information from anywhere, anytime, via an Internet connection. Users can access telephony, voicemail, email, and fax services from any connected endpoint. The hosted model reduces IT and communications expenses for businesses, protects against data loss and disaster downtime, and realizes a greater return on their invested resources through increased employee productivity and reduced telecom costs.

== History ==
The IAN is rooted in the rise of cloud computing. The underlying concept dates back to the 1950s, when large-scale mainframes became available in academia and corporations, accessible via thin clients and terminal computers. Because it was costly to buy a mainframe, it became essential to find ways to get the greatest return on the investment, allowing multiple users to share both the physical access to the computer from multiple terminals as well as to share the CPU time, eliminating periods of inactivity, which became known in the industry as time-sharing.

The increasing demand and use of computers in universities and research labs in the late 1960s generated the need for high-speed interconnections between computer systems. A 1970 report from the Lawrence Radiation Laboratory detailing the growth of their "Octopus" network gave a good indication of the situation.

As computers became more prevalent, scientists and technologists explored ways to make large-scale computing power available to more users through time-sharing, experimenting with algorithms to provide the optimal use of the infrastructure, platform, and applications with prioritized access to the CPU and efficiency for the end users.

John McCarthy opined in the 1960s that "computation may someday be organized as a public utility.". Almost all the modern-day characteristics of cloud computing (elastic provision, provided as a utility, online, illusion of infinite supply), the comparison to the electricity industry, and the use of public, private, government, and community forms were thoroughly explored in Douglas Parkhill's 1966 book, The Challenge of the Computer Utility. Other scholars have shown that cloud computing's roots go back to the 1950s when scientist Herb Grosch (the author of Grosch's law) postulated that the entire world would operate on dumb terminals powered by about 15 large data centers. Due to the expense of these powerful computers, many corporations and other entities could avail themselves of computing capability through time-sharing, and several organizations, such as GE's GEISCO, IBM subsidiary The Service Bureau Corporation (SBC, founded in 1957), Tymshare (founded in 1966), National CSS (founded in 1967 and bought by Dun & Bradstreet in 1979), Dial Data (bought by Tymshare in 1968), and Bolt, Beranek, and Newman (BBN) marketed time-sharing as a commercial venture.

The development of the Internet from being document-centric via semantic data towards more and more services was described as a "Dynamic Web." This contribution focused on the need for better meta-data to explain implementation details and conceptual details of model-based applications.

In the 1990s, telecommunications companies that previously offered primarily dedicated point-to-point data circuits began offering virtual private network (VPN) services with comparable quality of service but at a much lower cost. By switching traffic to balance utilization as they saw fit, they were able to optimize their overall network usage. The cloud symbol was used to denote the demarcation point between the provider's responsibility and the users' responsibility. Cloud computing extends this boundary to cover servers and the network infrastructure.

After the dot-com bubble, Amazon played a crucial role in the development of cloud computing by modernizing their data centers, which, like most computer networks, were using as little as 10% of their capacity at any time to leave room for occasional spikes. Having found that the new cloud architecture resulted in significant internal efficiency improvements whereby small, fast-moving "two-pizza teams" (teams small enough to be fed with two pizzas) could add new features faster and more efficiently, Amazon initiated a new product development effort to provide cloud computing to external customers and launched Amazon Web Services (AWS) on a utility computing basis in 2006.

In early 2008, Eucalyptus became the first open-source, AWS API-compatible platform for deploying private clouds. In early 2008, OpenNebula, enhanced in the RESERVOIR European Commission-funded project, became the first open-source software for deploying private and hybrid clouds and for the federation of clouds. In the same year, efforts were focused on providing Quality of Service guarantees (as required by real-time interactive applications) to cloud-based infrastructures in the IRMOS European Commission-funded project's framework, resulting in a real-time cloud environment. By mid-2008, Gartner saw an opportunity for cloud computing "to shape the relationship among consumers of IT services, those who use IT services and those who sell them" and observed that "organizations are switching from company-owned hardware and software assets to per-use service-based models" so that the "projected shift to computing... will result in dramatic growth in IT products in some areas and significant reductions in other areas."

In 2011, RESERVOIR was established in Europe to create open-source technologies that allow cloud providers to build an advanced cloud by balancing workloads, lowering costs, and moving workloads across geographic locations through a federation of clouds. Also, in 2011, IBM announced that the Smarter Computing framework would support a Smarter Planet. Cloud computing is a critical piece among the various components of the Smarter Computing foundation.

Currently, The availability of high-capacity networks, low-cost computers, and storage devices and the widespread adoption of hardware virtualization, service-oriented architecture, and autonomic and utility computing have led to unusually large growth in cloud computing. Virtual worlds and peer-to-peer architectures have helped develop the way for the concept of an IAN.

iAreaNet was founded in 1999 by CEO James DeCrescenzo as a company called Internet Area Network, devoted to providing offsite data storage and disaster prevention before the cloud existed in widely deployed commercial form. It pioneered the idea of an IAN. Since then, it has strengthened operations. It has made significant investments in developing a robust infrastructure to provide businesses with an array of technology solutions, including the patent-pending iAreaOffice, which commercializes the concept of an IAN by eliminating the need for traditional LAN, WAN, or telephone system for business communications.

== See also ==
- Cloud-computing comparison
- Cloud database
- Cloud storage
- Cloud collaboration
- VPN
