= Wide area application services =

Technology developed by Cisco Systems

Cisco Wide Area Application Services (WAAS) is technology developed by Cisco Systems that optimizes the performance of any Transmission Control Protocol (TCP)-based application operating in a wide area network (WAN) environment while preserving and strengthening branch security.

== Overview ==
WAAS combines WAN optimization, acceleration of TCP-based applications, and Cisco's Wide Area File Services (WAFS) in a single appliance or blade. It is Cisco's attempt to keep WAN optimization residing firmly in the router, eliminating the need to deploy acceleration appliances throughout the infrastructure. The technology preserves TCP information within the network while offering the performance benefits that come along with using WAN optimization technology.

== Limitations ==
WAN optimization appliances have traditionally limited IT when it comes to maintaining functions such as security, quality of service, visibility, and monitoring end-to-end transactions because they tend to cause problems for most network monitoring devices and tools. By design, WAN Optimization “confuses” performance monitoring systems by changing packet header data.

== Latest release ==
Cisco's latest WAAS software release, announced at the 2007 Cisco Networkers conference, is the industry's first solution for both end-to-end monitoring and acceleration of application traffic.
