= Cisco Catalyst 1900 =

Ethernet switch model

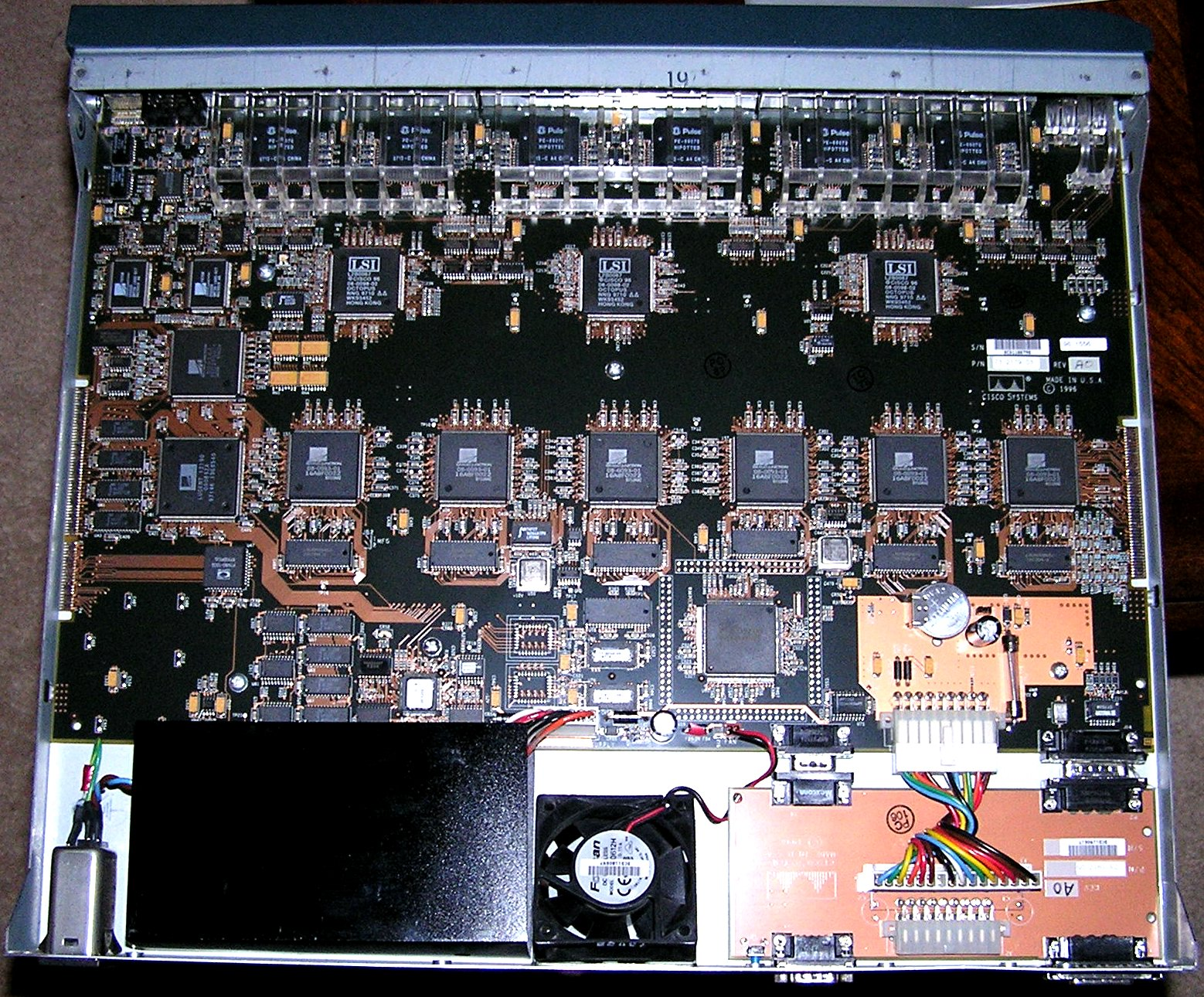
The inside of a Cisco 1900-series switch

The Cisco Catalyst 1900 is a 19" rack mountable, managed (configurable) 10BASE-T Ethernet switch with 100BASE-TX/100BASE-FX uplink ports. This product was popular in small office networks because of its features and price.

This switch was sold until 2002, reaching end of life (EOL) in 2007 and is no longer supported by Cisco.

== Models ==
The switch was available in 12-port and 24-port models with either two 100BASE-TX uplink ports or one fibre and one copper 100 Mbit/s uplink ports. In addition to this, one AUI port was available on the rear panel for connecting to fiber or legacy 10BASE2 or 10BASE5 networks.

This switch is closely related to the Cisco Catalyst 2820 series, which uses the same software, and shares many of the same features

== Software ==
The 1900 series software was available in two editions. Whilst the enterprise edition's command-line interface (CLI) had a strong similarity to IOS, the switches ran a unique software which was neither IOS or CatOS.

- Standard Edition - Menu based configuration. No CLI access available. Could be software upgraded to Enterprise Edition.
- Enterprise Edition - Same as standard but with extra features enabled. CLI access is possible.

The last software version released was 9.00.07 (2003).

== Features ==
- ISL trunking on fast Ethernet ports
- VLANS (4 can be configured)
- SNMP
- Optional web based configuration
- IEEE 802.1D Spanning-Tree Protocol support.
- Support for 1024 MAC Addresses.
- Up to 320-Mbit/s maximum forwarding bandwidth.
- Up to 450,000 packets per second aggregate packet-forwarding rate.

== Hardware ==
- Processor: Intel 80486
- RAM: 2 MB
- FLASH: 1 MB
- Backplane: 1 Gbit/s
- MAC Address table size: 1024
- 10BaseT ports 12 or 24 Full Duplex
- 100BASE-TX ports 1 or 2 Full Duplex
- 100BASE-FX ports 1 (on 1924F) Full Duplex
- AUI port
- Internal AC power supply
- DC connector for external DC power (Cisco RPS)

== History ==
The switch is based on a design purchased from Grand Junction Networks

Original pricing approx US$900 for a WS-1912-C to approx US$1700 for a WS-1924-EN
