= Cisco Cius =

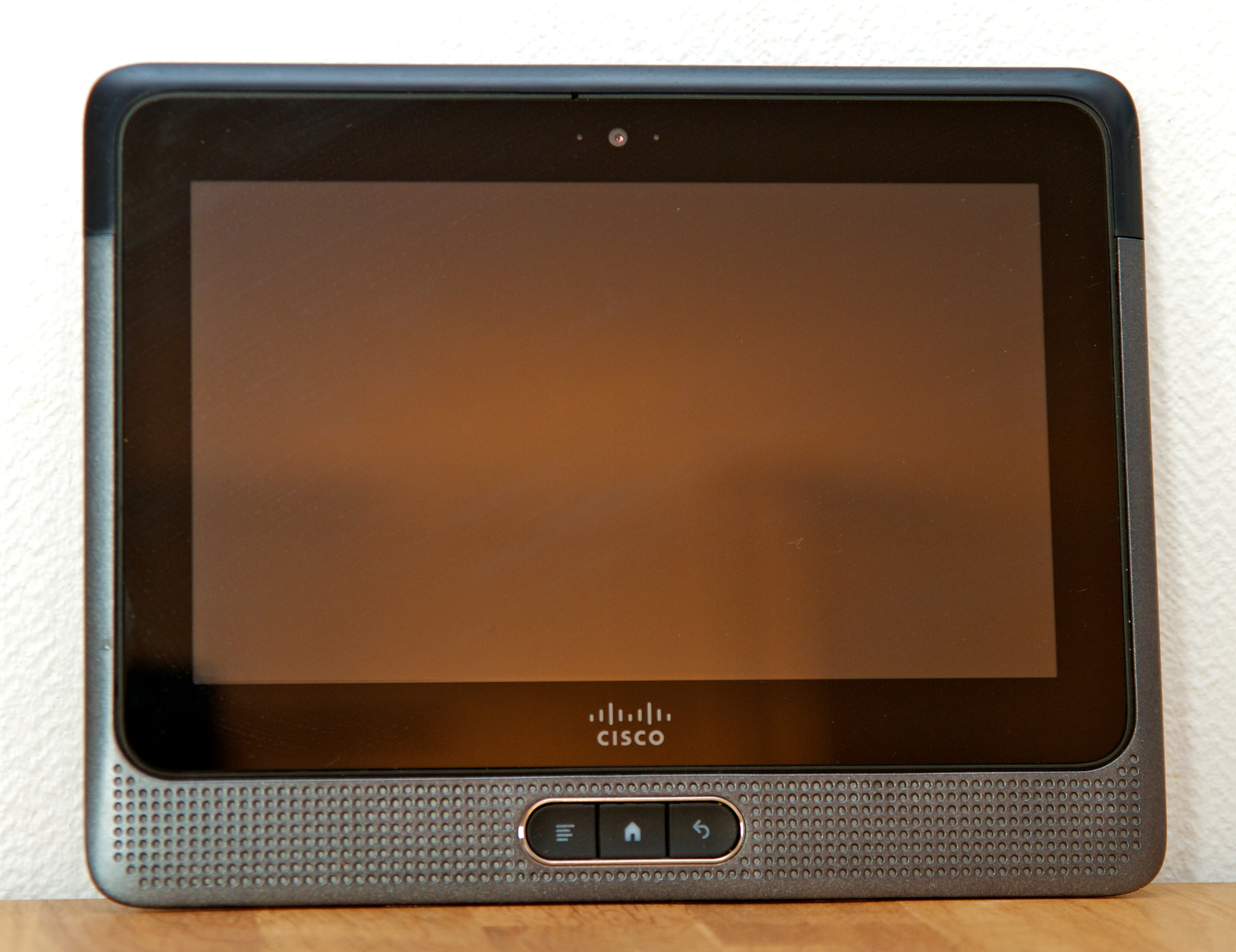
A Cisco Cius

The Cisco Cius is a business-oriented, Android-based tablet computer from Cisco Systems. The device, which was touted as an "enterprise tablet", was described as a mobile collaboration device that is bundled with Cisco's collaboration and applications suite and was targeted at the mobile workforce. It was used together with a media dock that was sold separately.

== History ==
Cius was announced on June 29 at Cisco Live 2010. Upon launch, it was reported that the device was not directly competing in the tablet market since it is aimed at organizations particularly those large enterprises that employ scattered workforce. Additionally, the device was also marketed to companies that are developing Android-based app infrastructure as well as healthcare organizations due to its videoconferencing features. In a demonstration, for instance, Cius was used in a live videoconferencing transmission from a submarine in the Aegean Sea.

Cisco also collaborated with AT&T, which first sold the device, in an initiative to facilitate app development for Cius in partnership with third party developers. Verizon also offered the device to its customers.

The Cius discontinued on May 24, 2012, although it will still be offered on a limited basis.

== Specifications ==
- Intel Atom 1.6 GHz processor with 1 GB RAM and 32 GB eMMC flash memory
- Android 2.2 (Froyo) operating system
- 7” high-resolution touchscreen
- 720p HD video
- Front and rear cameras
- 802.11a/b/g/n Wi-Fi, 4G data, and Bluetooth
- Micro SD slot, micro USB connector, HDMI connector, 3.5-mm stereo headphone jack
- Removable battery

There will also be an optional HD media station that will support USB, 10/100/1000 Ethernet, and a handset option. Cius initially shipped with Android 2.2, an outdated system during its launch and was chosen due to the device's high security specifications.

== See also ==
- BlackBerry PlayBook
- List of Android devices
