= Cisco LAN2LAN Personal Office for ISDN =

Cisco LAN2LAN Personal Office for ISDN', created by Cisco Systems, was an entry-level ISDN remote access solution intended to be used by remote teleworkers, small remote sites, and schools. Dial on demand was heavily featured, as the product was from an era where time online and data transfers were cost prohibitive.

The solution consisted of an ISDN adapter card with one ISDN Basic Rate Interface (BRI) port that plugged into a PC chassis.

These access cards were developed in conjunction with Newport Systems Inc and ITK GmbH, Germany, and sold under the Cisco banner. The LAN2LAN Personal Office for ISDN tied a PC to a central site. They featured dial-on-demand support and was able to connect to remote Cisco ISDN routers. The cards were only able to transmit data over a single ISDN B channel (i.e. 64 kbit/s).

An ODI driver was included that allowed TCP/IP and IPX connections. An automated install setup program was included.

Supported technology

- *Point-to-Point Protocol (PPP)
- Challenge Handshake Authentication Protocol (CHAP)
- Calling Line Identification (CLI)

== LAN2LAN Enterprise ==
An enterprise endpoint was also available. This was essentially a software router that could be run from a communications server.

Pricing (circa 1995) US $2,610

== Launch Pricing ==
Original list pricing circa 1995

'Cisco LAN2LAN Personal Office for ISDN' - US$675
