= NetEqualizer =

APconnections, Inc.
- Company type: Private
- Industry: Technology; Networking; Computer hardware
- Founded: Lafayette, Colorado, U.S. (August 1, 2003; 22 years ago)
- Founders: Art Reisman
- Area served: Worldwide
- Products: Traffic shaping, Quality of service, Intrusion prevention systems, Networking
- Website: www.netequalizer.com www.netequalizernews.com

The NetEqualizer is a bandwidth shaping appliance designed for voice and data networks, created by APconnections in 2003. NetEqualizer traffic shaping appliances use built-in behavior-based algorithms to automatically shape traffic during peak periods on the network. When the network is congested, the fairness algorithms favor business class applications at the expense of large file downloads. The favored applications include those such as VoIP, web browsing, web-based applications, chat and email. Traffic is prioritized based on the nature of the traffic, so the NetEqualizer remains Net Neutral.

The NetEqualizer also provides quality of service (QoS) through rate limiting, shared limits, and quota. New in 2015 is a DDoS Monitor. In addition, the NetEqualizer can be configured to control both encrypted an unencrypted peer-to-peer file sharing (P2P) traffic.

Add-on modules include directory integration (NDI), caching (NCO), and a DDoS Firewall.

The NetEqualizer has been implemented by colleges, universities, libraries, hotels, and businesses around the world. The appliance is currently being used in the rebuilding efforts in both Iraq and Afghanistan.

APconnections is a privately held company founded in 2003 and is based in Lafayette, Colorado.
