= Wide area network =

Computer network that connects devices across a large distance and area

A local area network (LAN) with connection to a wide area network (WAN)

A wide area network (WAN) is a telecommunications network that extends over a large geographic area. Wide area networks are often established with leased telecommunication circuits.

Businesses, as well as schools and government entities, use wide area networks to relay data to staff, students, clients, buyers and suppliers from various locations around the world. In essence, this mode of telecommunication allows a business to effectively carry out its daily functions regardless of location. The Internet may be considered a WAN. Many WANs are, however, built for one particular organization and are private. WANs can be separated from local area networks (LANs) in that the latter refers to physically proximal networks.

== Design options ==
The textbook definition of a WAN is a computer network spanning regions, countries, or even the world. However, in terms of the application of communication protocols and concepts, it may be best to view WANs as computer networking technologies used to transmit data over long distances, and between different networks. This distinction stems from the fact that common local area network (LAN) technologies operating at lower layers of the OSI model (such as the forms of Ethernet or Wi-Fi) are often designed for physically proximal networks, and thus cannot transmit data over tens, hundreds, or even thousands of miles or kilometres.

WANs are used to connect LANs and other types of networks together so that users and computers in one location can communicate with users and computers in other locations. Many WANs are built for one particular organization and are private. Others, built by Internet service providers, provide connections from an organization's LAN to the Internet.

WANs are often built using leased lines. At each end of the leased line, a router connects the LAN on one side with a second router within the LAN on the other. Because leased lines can be very expensive, instead of using leased lines, WANs can also be built using less costly circuit switching or packet switching methods. Network protocols, including TCP/IP, deliver transport and addressing functions. Protocols including Packet over SONET/SDH, Multiprotocol Label Switching (MPLS), Asynchronous Transfer Mode (ATM) and Frame Relay are often used by service providers to deliver the links that are used in WANs. It is also possible to build a WAN with Ethernet.

Academic research into wide area networks can be broken down into three areas: mathematical models, network emulation, and network simulation.

Performance improvements are sometimes delivered via wide area file services or WAN optimization.

== Private networks ==
Of the approximately four billion addresses defined in IPv4, about 18 million addresses in three ranges are reserved for use in private networks. Packets addressed in these ranges are not routable on the public Internet; they are ignored by all public routers. Therefore, private hosts cannot directly communicate with public networks, but require network address translation at a routing gateway for this purpose.

Reserved private IPv4 network ranges
Name	CIDR block	Address range	Number of addresses	Obsolete classful description
24-bit block	10.0.0.0/8	10.0.0.0 – 10.255.255.255	16777216	Single Class A.
20-bit block	172.16.0.0/12	172.16.0.0 – 172.31.255.255	1048576	Contiguous range of 16 Class B blocks.
16-bit block	192.168.0.0/16	192.168.0.0 – 192.168.255.255	65536	Contiguous range of 256 Class C blocks.

Since two private networks, e.g., two branch offices, cannot directly communicate via the public Internet, the two networks must be bridged across the Internet via a virtual private network (VPN) or other form of IP tunnel that encapsulates packets, including their headers containing the private addresses, for transmission across the public network. Additionally, encapsulated packets may be encrypted to secure their data.

== Connection technology ==
Many technologies are available for wide-area network links. Examples include circuit-switched telephone lines, radio wave transmission, and optical fiber. New developments have successively increased transmission rates. In c. 1960, a 110 bit/s line was normal on the edge of the WAN, while core links of 56 or 64 kbit/s were considered fast. Today, households are connected to the Internet with dial-up, asymmetric digital subscriber line (ADSL), cable, WiMAX, cellular network or fiber. The speeds that people can currently use range from 28.8 kbit/s through a 28K modem over a telephone connection to speeds as high as 100 Gbit/s using 100 Gigabit Ethernet.

The following communication and networking technologies have been used to implement WANs.

- Asynchronous Transfer Mode
- Cable modem
- Cellular networks
- Dial-up internet
- Digital subscriber line
- Fiber-optic communication
- Frame Relay
- ISDN
- Leased line
- SD-WAN
- Synchronous optical networking
- Very small aperture terminal (VSAT)
- Wi-Fi
- WiMAX
- X.25

AT&T conducted trials in 2017 for business use of 400-gigabit Ethernet. Researchers Robert Maher, Alex Alvarado, Domaniç Lavery, and Polina Bayvel of University College London were able to increase networking speeds to 1.125 terabits per second. Christos Santis, graduate student Scott Steger, Amnon Yariv, Martin and Eileen Summerfield developed a new laser that potentially quadruples transfer speeds with fiber optics.

=== Low-power wide-area networks ===
Some competing standards and vendors for LPWAN space include:

- DASH7, a low latency, bi-directional firmware standard that operates over multiple LPWAN radio technologies including LoRa.
- Wize is an open and royalty-free standard for LPWAN derived from the European Standard Wireless Mbus.
- Chirp spread spectrum (CSS) based devices.
- Sigfox, UNB-based technology and French company.
- LoRa is a proprietary, chirp spread spectrum radio modulation technology for LPWAN used by LoRaWAN, Haystack Technologies, and Symphony Link.
- mioty, implementing Telegram Splitting technology.
- Weightless is an open standard, narrowband technology for LPWAN used by Ubiik
- ELTRES, a LPWA technology developed by Sony, with transmission ranges of over 100 km while moving at speeds of 100 km/h.
- IEEE 802.11ah, also known as Wi-Fi HaLow, is a low-power, wide-area implementation of 802.11 wireless networking standard using sub-gig frequencies.

== See also ==
- Cell relay
- Internet area network (IAN)
- Label switching
- Wide area application services
- Wireless WAN
