= Wide area file services =

Wide area file services (WAFS) products allow remote office users to access and share files globally at LAN speeds over the WAN. Distributed enterprises that deploy WAFS solutions are able to consolidate storage to corporate datacenters, eliminating the need to back up and manage data that previously resided in their remote offices. WAFS uses techniques such as SMB and MAPI protocol optimization, data compression, and sometimes storing recurrent data patterns in a local cache.

WAFS is a subset of WAN optimization, which also caches SSL Intranet as well as dynamic web page content and multimedia traffic generated by educational technology, to accelerate a greater percentage of WAN traffic.

The term was coined by Brad O'Neill of the analyst firm Taneja Group in a May 2004 article for InfoStor magazine.
