= WAN optimization =

Techniques for improving data transfer over wide area networks

WAN optimization is a collection of techniques for improving data transfer across wide area networks (WANs). In 2008, the WAN optimization market was estimated to be $1 billion, and was to grow to $4.4 billion by 2014 according to Gartner, a technology research firm. In 2015, Gartner estimated the WAN optimization market to be a $1.1 billion market.

The most common measures of TCP data-transfer efficiencies (i.e., optimization) are throughput, bandwidth requirements, latency, protocol optimization, and congestion, as manifested in dropped packets. In addition, the WAN itself can be classified with regard to the distance between endpoints and the amount of data transferred. Two common business WAN topologies are branch to headquarters and data center to data center (DC2DC). In general, "branch" WAN links are closer, use less bandwidth, support more simultaneous connections, support smaller connections and more short-lived connections, and handle a greater variety of protocols. They are used for business applications such as email, content management systems, database applications, and Web delivery. In comparison, DC2DC WAN links tend to require more bandwidth, are more distant, and involve fewer connections, but those connections are bigger (100 Mbit/s to 1 Gbit/s flows) and of longer duration. Traffic on a DC2DC WAN may include replication, backup, data migration, virtualization, and other business continuity/disaster recovery (BC/DR) flows.

WAN optimization has been the subject of extensive academic research almost since the advent of the WAN. In the early 2000s, research in both the private and public sectors turned to improving the end-to-end throughput of TCP, and the target of the first proprietary WAN optimization solutions was the branch WAN. In recent years, however, the rapid growth of digital data and the concomitant need to store and protect it have presented a need for DC2DC WAN optimization. For example, such optimizations can be performed to increase overall network capacity utilization, meet inter-datacenter transfer deadlines, or minimize average completion times of data transfers. As another example, private inter-datacenter WANs can benefit optimizations for fast and efficient geo-replication of data and content, such as newly computed machine learning models or multimedia content.

Component techniques of branch WAN optimization include deduplication, wide area file services (WAFS), SMB proxy, HTTPS proxy, media multicasting, web caching, and bandwidth management. Requirements for DC2DC WAN Optimization also center around deduplication and TCP acceleration; however, these must occur in the context of multi-gigabit data transfer rates.

== WAN optimization techniques ==
Deduplication
Eliminates the transfer of redundant data across the WAN by sending references instead of the actual data. By working at the byte level, benefits are achieved across IP applications.
Data compression
Relies on data patterns that can be represented more efficiently. Essentially, compression techniques similar to ZIP, RAR, ARJ, etc. are applied on-the-fly to data passing through hardware (or virtual machine) based WAN acceleration appliances.
Latency optimization
Can include TCP refinements such as window-size scaling, selective acknowledgements, Layer 3 congestion control algorithms, and even co-location strategies in which the application is placed in near proximity to the endpoint to reduce latency. In some implementations, the local WAN optimizer will answer the requests of the client locally instead of forwarding the request to the remote server in order to leverage write-behind and read-ahead mechanisms to reduce WAN latency.
Caching/proxy
Staging data in local caches; Relies on human behavior, accessing the same data over and over.
Forward error correction
Mitigates packet loss by adding another loss-recovery packet for every N packets that are sent, and this would reduce the need for retransmissions in error-prone and congested WAN links.
Protocol spoofing
Bundles multiple requests from chatty applications into one. May also include streamlining protocols such as CIFS.
Traffic shaping
Controls data flow for specific applications. Giving flexibility to network operators/network admins to decide which applications take precedence over the WAN. A common use case of traffic shaping would be to prevent one protocol or application from hogging or flooding a link over other protocols deemed more important by the business/administrator. Some WAN acceleration devices are able to traffic shape with granularity far beyond traditional network devices. Such as shaping traffic on a per-user and per-application basis simultaneously.
Equalizing
Makes assumptions on what needs immediate priority based on the data usage. Usage examples for equalizing may include wide-open unregulated Internet connections and clogged VPN tunnels.
Connection limits
Prevents access gridlock in and to denial of service or to peer. Best suited for wide-open Internet access links, can also be used links.
Simple rate limits
Prevents one user from getting more than a fixed amount of bandwidth. Best suited as a stopgap first effort for remediating a congested Internet connection or WAN link.
