= Dell Networking =

Networking division of Dell

- Developer: Dell
- Released: 2013
- Predecessor: Dell PowerConnect

Dell Networking is the portfolio of computer networking products produced by Dell. This brand name originated in the first half of 2013 when Dell started to rebrand their former networking-related product brand known as Dell PowerConnect (including the Force10 portfolio).

== History ==
Dell used to be mainly a so-called box-shifter: they produced computers that could (only) be bought directly from Dell, but they didn't offer complete solutions. With the acquisition of Perot Systems, Dell entered the, more profitable, services market and also expanded on the software and system-management-market by acquiring KACE Networks, Quest Software, AppAssure and Credant Technologies. Other notable acquisitions include storage systems like EqualLogic, thin-client producer Wyse and firewall/security producer SonicWall.

=== Networking ===
In 2011, Dell took over high-end network-equipment producer Force10 Networks, which mainly produced multi-layer switches for data center environments, bringing Dell to the market for enterprise and datacenter class network equipment. Before that point, Dell did not produce their own network equipment: the switches that were sold under the brand PowerConnect were products designed and built for Dell by 3rd parties such as Broadcom and Marvell Technology Group. Dell also offered existing products from other suppliers with PowerConnect branding, such as the B-series for Brocade (Ethernet) switches or J-series for Juniper switches. But by buying Force10 and later network-security provider SonicWall, the company now had its own intellectual property networking systems and stopped selling most J- and B-series switches, but continued to offer the legacy PowerConnect products made by Broadcom and Marvell with some overlap in the Force10 products.

In 2013, Dell begun the process to fully integrate these two product lines and rebrand the entire portfolio into Dell Networking, all running on Dell Networking Operating System (instead of FTOS and Powerconnect firmware). All new networking products were to be marketed under the new name Dell Networking with a standardized naming-convention: Dell Networking ⟨series-letter⟩-⟨4 digit number⟩. Most existing PowerConnect products kept their existing names until they went end of sales (EOS), when they would be replaced by new Dell Networking products or be rebranded to the new naming convention.

== Product families ==
The Dell Networking products will come in several families. The new naming system will partially follow the existing Force10 naming system: E-series for chassis-based modular (core) switches, C-series for chassis-based datacenter-access switches, S-series rack switches and Z-series for distributed core-switches.

- Z series: Datacenter distributed core switches: 3 models, the original Z9000, 2 RU high with 32 x 40 Gbit/s QSFP+ Ethernet ports and its follow up Z9500, 3RU high with up to 132 x 40 Gb QSFP+ slots. and the Z9100 including 100 Gb interfaces.
- C series: Chassis based campus access/core switches: 2 original models, C150 (9RU) and C300 (13RU) for 1 and 10 Gbit/s and the new C9010 system supporting external port-extenders, where specific N-series models can be (re)used as chassis managed port extender.
- E series: Virtualized core chassis-based switches. campus, office or data center aggregation/core switches: 3 models for 1 and 10 Gbit/s aggregation.
- S series: Fixed form-factor datacenter switches for 1, 10 and 40 Gbit/s Ethernet.
- X series: simple web-managed layer2 or l2+ campus switches based on Marvell networks chipset.
- W series: existing PowerConnect Wireless range which are OEM-versions of the Aruba Networks portfolio.
- M series: MXL and MIO modules running DNOS9.x and the existing PowerConnect M blade switches for the Dell M1000e chassis system including smaller versions of the MIOA/MXL switches for the FX2 mini chassis.
- N series: Campus access and aggregation switches with models for PoE+ offering 10 Gb or 40 Gb uplinks to the core. N-series switches run DNOS6.x on a Linux kernel.
- Legacy Powerconnect switches

== Portfolio ==
Below is an overview of the portfolio of Dell Networking switches, including active models under the PowerConnect name.

=== Dell PowerConnect ===
(For older products, not longer in active portfolio, please see the Dell PowerConnect page). The current portfolio of Dell PowerConnect rack switches consists of the following series:

- Power connect 2800 series: web-managed(only) 10/100/1000 Ethernet switches
- Power connect 3500 series: managed 10/100 Mb layer 2 switches
- Power connect 5500 series: managed 10/100/1000 Mb layer 2 switches (with limited layer3 options)
- Power connect 6200 series: managed multi-layer gigabit Ethernet switches
- Power connect 7000 series: managed multi-layer gigabit Ethernet switches
- Power connect 8100 series: managed multi-layer ten gigabit Ethernet switches

The PowerConnects 2800, 3500 and 5500 are based on Marvell Technology Group equipment while the PowerConnect 6200, 7000, 8100 and the blade-switches PCM6220, PCM6348 and PCM8024(-k) are powered by Broadcom.

==== PowerConnect 2800 ====
The Dell Networking PCT2800 web-managed switches are entry-level Ethernet switches that only offer a web-based GUI management interface. There are 4 models offering between 8 and 48 ports per switch. The interfaces on the switches are all copper-based gigabit Ethernet-ports and the 24 and 48 ports switches offer 2 or 4 'combo' ports where the last 2 (resp. 4) ports can use either the RJ45/UTP 1000BaseT copper-interface or a fiber SFP transceiver for uplinks to a distribution or core switch. All switches offer standard features like VLANs, link-aggregation, auto-negotiation for speed- and duplex setting. The MAC address-table can hold up to 8000 MAC addresses in its forwarding table and have a 2 Mb packet-buffering capacity.

==== PowerConnect 3500 ====
The PowerConnect 3500 series switches are Ethernet access-switches which comes in 4 models: the PCT3524 and PCT3548 with 24 resp 48 10/100 Mb Ethernet ports and the PCT3524P / PCT3548P with 24 or 48 10/100 Mb with PoE option to power VOIP phones, Wifi Access-points or IP cameras. All models can be provided with a redundant power supply for either pure redundant power or to provide a full PoE power budget for the 48 ports PoE switch. The technical specifications of the 'non-PoE' and the 'PoE' models are the same in regards to switching capabilities and the main difference between the 24 and 48 port models is the total forwarding rate of the switch: 12,8 Gbit/s for both 24 port models and 17,6 Gbit/s for the 48 port models. As with the PCT2800 models the MAC address table can hold up to 8000 MAC addresses.

Apart from all standard layer2 switching capabilities as VLAN's, link aggregation (static and LACP, dot1x access-security and dynamic VLAN assignment, the switches also offer some basic IP routing/layer 3 processing.

All PCT3500 switches offer two-gigabit Ethernet (1000BaseT) ports for high-speed uplinks to distribution or core switches or for stacking of switches and two gigabits SFP ports for a 1 Gbit/s fiber transceiver for uplinks to distribution/core layer.

==== PowerConnect 5500 ====
The PowerConnect 5500 series switches are gigabit Ethernet access-switches, available in 4 models: either a 24 or 48 port gigabit Ethernet switch or a 24/48 port gigabit Ethernet switch with Power-over-Ethernet option. Regardless of the model, the switches offer two HDMI ports for stacking and two SFP+ 10Gbit transceiver ports for 10Gb uplinks.

The technical specifications of the 4 models are all the same, except for the number of ports and the PoE feature and the total switching capacity of 128 Gbit/s (24 port) or 176 Gbit/s (48 port) with a MAC address table size of 16.000 entries, up to 4000 VLAN's, support for link-aggregation, VLAN tagging, dot1x security, and dynamic VLAN assignment, etc.

Although the switches are mainly layer-2 Ethernet switches they do offer some IP features like static routing (up to 64 static routes), IP or MAC-based access-lists, DHCP snooping, quality of service options and IGMP (multicast) features. Up to 8 switches out of the 5500 series can be stacked, using the built-in HDMI stack-ports, to form one logical switch. The switch also offers special features for a voice-VLAN as well as extensive options for dot1x security and dynamic VLAN assignment via RADIUS or TACACS+ server. For better energy efficiency the switch also offers Energy-Efficient Ethernet or EEE (IEEE 802.3az) allowing the switch to negotiate a lower link-speed on access-interfaces when the connected client doesn't require the full bandwidth, and when the connected client requires more bandwidth than the active link speed it will (re)negotiate a higher speed. The PCT5500 series support Spanning-tree, Rapid Spanning-tree, and Multiple spanning-tree. The default setting is rapid-spanning tree.

Other features offered by the PCT5500 series is port-mirroring, jumbo-frame support, dynamic ARP inspection, IGMP snooping, private VLAN configuration, LLDP/LLDP-MED, management-access-lists, etc.

The two PoE enabled switches can offer up to 15.4 watts of power to each of the 24 or 48 copper gigabit interfaces. To provide (full) power to more than 24 ports, an extra 'redundant power supply' must be installed on the PCT5548P. In case of the failure of one of the power supplies, PoE priorities can be set to continue to give PoE power to the most important devices and switch off less important devices.

==== Managed multi-layer gigabit Ethernet switches ====
Dell Networking offers two main-models for layer3 gigabit Ethernet rack switches: the PowerConnect 6200 series and the PowerConnect 7000 series. In regards to available models for the number of ports, PoE support, and copper/fiber the PCT6200 and PCT7000 models are very similar. The basic features of both models are also very alike, but the PCT7000 series offer a range of additional features that are not available in the PCT6200. Some important differences between the PCT6200 and PCT7000 are that the PCT7000 offers a dedicated 'out-of-band' management interface. Although both switches are stackable, only PCT6200 models or PCT7000 models can be combined in a single stack. The only exception is that it is possible to combine the PCT7000 series with the blade-switch PCM6348 in a single stack. It is not possible to combine a PCT6200 rack switch with a PCM6220 blade-switch.

==== Common features ====
The PCT6200 series is the first real 'multilayer switch' and the PCT7000 is a more advanced and powerful multi-layer switch. But for both models the following characteristics apply: besides the basic IP features offered by the PCT5500 the PCT6200 series (and above) are real multi-layer switches offering dynamic routing features like RIP and OSPF. The PCT6200/PCT7000 series offer either 24 or 48 port switches with a PoE enabled variant on both the 24 and 48 port. And there are also switches offering 24 SFP interfaces for an all-fiber network and/or to let the "-F series" switch be used as a distribution or core level with uplinks to remote access-switches via a fiber-optic link. Each of the models offers 24+4 or 48+4 ports on the front-side of the switch where the last (highest) 4 ports are so-called 'combo ports': for the 'copper' based switches (1000BaseT or PoE models) there is an option to connect up to four fiber links using an SFP transceiver instead of the corresponding RJ45 copper interfaces. And on the PCTxx24F up to four RJ45 UTP ports (without PoE) can be used.

On the back-side of each model, there are two extension-module bays that can be used for stacking or for 10 Gbit uplinks offering two SFP+ transceiver ports. When stacking the PowerConnect series switches, the stacking module must be installed in bay1.

==== Differences ====
Some of the most obvious differences between the PCT6200 models and the PCT7000 models are:

- The PCT7000 also offers a dual 10GbaseT copper 10 Gbit uplink module where the 6200 series only offers an SFP+ uplink module
- The PCT6200 stacking module can also be configured to run as a 10 Gbit Ethernet module with CX4 interfaces
- On the PCT7000 series, a stack can be combined with the PCM6348 blade switch in a Dell M1000e chassis
- The PCT7000 series offer an 'out of band' management interface which keeps management traffic out of the main switching/routing part of the switches.
- The PCT7048R and PCT7048RA is a switch with redundant power-supply (without need for external RPS module) and the RA offers reverse-air flow (back to ports direction, compared to ports to 'power supply side' in normal airflow). The PCT6200 series has only standard airflow; for a redundant power supply, a separate (1 RU) RPS module is required.
- The PCT7000 series offers a wider range of supported SFP+ optics, including some long-range multi-mode 10 Gb optics

Model	switch capacity	forwarding rate	MAC address table length	LAG support (static ports)	Dynamic LAG (LACP groups)	ACL support
6224/6224P/6224F	136Gbit/s	95 Mpps	8000	128 links	8 LACP groups	100 lists/127 entries/list
6248/6248P	184Gbit/s	131Mpps	8000	128 links	8 LACP groups	100 lists/127 entries/list
7024 (all types)	176Gbit/s	125Mpps	32.000	72 groups/8 links/group	72 groups/8 links/group	100 lists, 1K rules/list, 8K total
7048 (all types)	224Gbit/s	160Mpps	32.000	72 groups/8 links/group	72 groups/8 links/group	100 lists, 1K rules/list, 8K total

==== PowerConnect 8100 ====
The latest addition on the PowerConnect portfolio is the Powerconnect 8132(f) and 8164(f) offering up to 32 or 64 10GbaseT or SFP+ ports. The 8164(f) also offers built-in two QSFP+ 40 Gb ports. All the PCT8100 models have one expansion slot allowing to insert a dual QSFP+ port for two 40 Gb interfaces or -with a break-out cable- 2 x 4 x SFP+ 10 Gbit/s ports Once the PCT8100 us updated to firmware level 6.0 or later, it is renamed to N4000 model.

The PowerConnect 8100 series switches announced in 2012 offered 24 or 48 ports on 10 Gb and 0 or 2 built-in ports for 40 Gb QSFP ports. All models also have one extension-module slot with either two QSFP 40 Gb ports, 4 SFP+ 10 Gb ports or 4 10GbaseT ports. It is a small (1U) switch with a high port-density and can be used as distribution or (collapsed)core switch for campus networks and for use in the datacenter it offers features such as loss-less Ethernet for iSCSI and FCoE, data center bridging (DCB) and iSCSI Auto-configure The PCT8100 series is a "multi-layer" switch which can be used as either a "pure" layer-2 Ethernet switch or as a "layer-3" switch with extensive IP routing functions. Most routing is done in hardware and can be done at (near) wire-speed. Management can be done via the "out-of-band" Ethernet interface or "in-band" by connecting to one of the vlan-ip addresses. Management is possible via HTTP(s), telnet, SSH or even serial console cable.

Model	10GbaseT (fixed)	SFP+ (fixed)	QSFP (fixed)	#modules	max.nr 10 Gb ports	power consumption
8132	24	0	0	1	32	240 W
8132F	0	24	0	1	32	176 W
8164	48	0	2	1	64	395 W
8164F	0	48	2	1	64	220 W

Up to 6 units in the 8100 series can be stacked to form one logical switch and any type of interface (10 Gb or 40 Gb, fiber-optical, or UTP copper) can be used for stacking. Similar to the rack-switches PCT7000 and PCT8024 series the switch offers an out-of-band Fast-Ethernet port for management as well as a serial console connection, required for initial configuration. The switch is built around the Broadcom Trident+ ASIC: the same ASIC as can be found in Cisco Nexus 5000 switches or Force10 models. The PowerConnect 8100 is initially released with firmware 5.0 of the switch-firmware which offers the same features as the PowerConnect 7000 and 8024 rack-switches and the different M-series Ethernet switches. The underlying operating system of the PCT8100 is based on Linux 2.6 where all other 'Broadcom powered' PowerConnects run on VxWorks.

=== Dell Networking H series ===
The Dell Networking H-series is an OEM version of Intels' Omni-Path platform, which itself is an alternative for InfiniBand. When managing an OmniPath network many commands are very similar to Infiniband switches.

=== Dell Networking N series ===
==== N1500 series: Gigabit layer-2 switches ====
The N1500 is a lower budget alternative to the N2000 series. It doesn't have dedicated (back-side) stacking-ports, but 10G Ethernet uplink ports can be converted to stacking ports, and multiple N1500s can be stacked together.

==== N2000 series: Gigabit layer-2 switches ====
The N2000 is a series with limited IP capabilities, replacing the legacy PowerConnect 5500 models along with the Force10 S25 and S50 models. There are two 'sizes', those with 24 1GbaseT ports, and those with 48, and each is available as either POE+ or standard switches, resulting in four distinct models. All models in the N20xx series can be stacked with other models in the same series. Although they do use the same stacking-cables as the N3000 series it is NOT possible to stack N2000 with N3000 switches. All models come with two 10Gbase SFP+ uplink ports and two 'tweeting' stacking ports at the back. Management can be done by assigning an IP address to switch or one of the VLAN-interfaces.

==== N3000 series: Gigabit multi-layer switches ====
The N3000 series is the follow-up for the legacy PowerConnect 6200 and 7000 series, as well as the Force10 S50/S55. It is pretty similar to the N2000 series in terms of hardware, but the OS offers advanced IP capabilities (including routing protocols like RIP, OSPF, PBR, etc.). It includes the same the four model choices provided in the N2000 series (24 or 48 ports, with or without POE+), but additionally the N3024F offers 24x SFP 1G ports.

Unlike the N2000 series, the N3000 has 'combo-ports' — All 'copper' based switches offer two SFP 1 Gb fibre ports (to be used instead of the two highest-numbered RJ45 1GBaseT port), and the N3024F offers two 1GbaseT RJ45 combo-ports (interface 23 and 24). All N3000 series switches also offer two SFP+ 10 Gb uplink ports. Optionally, a module can be added for another two SFP+ ports or two 10GBaseT RJ45 ports. Stacking can be done via the built-in 'twenty gig' ports and for management, an out-of-band 1G Ethernet management port can be used.

==== N4000: 10 Gbit multi-layer switches ====
The N4000 series is the new name for the former PowerConnect 8100 series. Any PCT8100 that is upgraded to firmware above version 6.0 will be renamed as an N40xx series. There are four main models: N4032F and N4064F with standard 24 or 48 10G SFP+ ports, 0 or 2 built-in QSFP+ ports and one module bay; and N4032 and N4064 with 24 or 48 10GbaseT RJ45 ports, 0 or 2 built-in QSFP+ ports, and one module bay. Each QSFP+ port can be split in a 4x SFP+ port using a break-out cable. The module bay can accommodate either a two-port QSFP+, a 4x 10GBaseT, or a 4x SFP+ module.

Stacking can be done via 10G or 40G ports, and the different N40xx series switches can 'mix and match' in a single stack. Management can be done 'in-band' or via the dedicated out-of-band 1 Gb Ethernet interface. See also above section on the PowerConnect 8100 series for model-details.

=== Datacenter switches ===
The former Force10 switches are now known as Dell Networking switches, but the model naming will be very similar to the old model naming in Force10:

=== Dell Networking S series ===
The current portfolio of Force10 switches can be split into two main ranges: existing S25, S50, S55, and S60 one gigabit rack-switches which are layer2 or multilayer access-switches and the S4810, S4820T and the new S5000 series. The existing Force10 S-series datacenter bridges will be extended with the S5000 series modular switch. The S5000 will be a modular switch that can support 48 x 10 Gb Ethernet ports + 4 x 40 Gb QSFP Ethernet or stacking ports.

The main difference between the S4810 or S4820T series switches is that the S5000 is modular: it can start with fewer ports, and the second big change is that it will be able to have native 8 Gb fibre channel ports modules, allowing to connect directly to a native fiber-channel switch (e.g. Brocade FC fabric). Like other switches in the DN S-series, the S5000 will support stacking and also Virtual Link Trunking: allowing the creation of an LACP port-channel from another switch or even server that terminates on two different (logical or physical) switches.

The S5000 is targeted for data center networking as either a 10G access-switch or a datacenter distribution switches. It can also be used as (routing) core switch in smaller data centers. It fully supports Data Center Bridging (DCB) and can also be used as FCoE or Fibre Channel switch by using a FC interface module. It provides full FC logic allowing one to directly connect FC based SAN's to the switch to fully support FCoE or Converged Networking in combination with the other 10G switches in the Dell Networking range.

The latest S6000 is marketed as either a core or spine switch in a medium-sized datacenter or a leaf switch for (very) large datacenters. The S6000 offers 32 x 40 Gb QSFP interfaces which can be 'split' into 4 x 10 Gb by using either splitter direct-attached-cable (QSFP->4xSFP+) or optical splitter cables with a maximum of 96 10G SFP+ ports and 8 remaining 40 Gb ports. The S6000 is based on the Broadcom Trident2 ASIC.

=== Dell Networking Z-series ===
Dell Networking Z-series has two models of high-capacity switches in a 2U (Z9000) or 3U (Z9500) form-factor. The original Z9000 offers 32 line-rate 40 Gb QSFP ports while the new Z9500 offers 132 x 40 Gb QSFP+ ports. It is possible to buy the Z9500 with only a number of the interfaces actually enabled and via additional licenses to be bought at a later moment in time datacenter owners can spread the investment with the growth of the traffic-demand.

Both switches are designed to be the 'spine' in a spine-leaf distributed core network-design and with the VLT technology fully redundant topologies can be built where two switches (partially) share the data pane but have independent management (unlike stacking where there is only a single management pane).

=== Dell Networking chassis-based switches ===
Besides the range of campus (N-series) and datacenter top-of-rack form-factor switches (S- and Z-series) Dell also offers two ranges of chassis-based product lines: the C-series and the E-series. The C-series are rebranded to the Dell model-number naming: one letter followed by 4 digits (instead of the legacy Force10 C150 and C300 chassis) while the E-series has not seen any name-change. (See main-article on Force10 chassis based switches.)
