= Virtual Link Trunking =

Networking protocols

Virtual Link Trunking (VLT) is a name that has been used for at least two proprietary network protocols. A link aggregation protocol developed by Force10 and an early VLAN tagging capability from 3Com.

== Force10 ==
Virtual Link Trunking or VLT is a proprietary aggregation protocol developed by Force10 (now Dell Networking) and available in their datacenter-class or enterprise-class network switches. VLT is implemented in the latest firmware releases of legacy (FTOS) OS9 for their high-end switches like the S-, Z- and E-series 10/25,40 and 100 Gbit/s datacenter switches. VLT is also implemented on the current OS10 Smart Fabric OS. Although VLT is a proprietary protocol from Dell Networking (formerly Force10) other vendors offer similar features to allow users to set up an aggregated link towards two (logical) different switches, where a standard aggregated link can only terminate on a single logical switch (thus either a single physical switch or on different members in a stacked switch setup) like Cisco vpc or MLAG. The latest Dell supported OS for their ONIE based PowerSwitch devices, SONiC, also offers a similar protocol as MLAG

VLT is a layer-2 link aggregation protocol between end-devices (servers) connected to (different) access-switches, offering these servers a redundant, load-balancing connection to the core-network in a loop-free environment, eliminating the requirement for the use of Spanning Tree Protocol. Where existing link aggregation protocols like (static) LAG (IEEE 802.3ad) or LACP (IEEE 802.1ax) require the different (physical) links to be connected to the same (logical) switch (such as stacked switches), the VLT, for example, allows link connectivity between a server and the network via two different switches.

Instead of using VLT between end-devices like servers it can also be used for uplinks between (access/distribution) switches and the core switches.

A major complication of existing link aggregation or bonding technologies is that all members interfaces of such a team/group need to terminate on one single logical switch. Beside increasing bandwidth another reason for link aggregation is redundancy. To make it possible to connect a LAG to different physical switches is to combine more than one physical switch into one logical switch using switch stacking techniques where the different physical boxes are seen as one logical switch for management and (spanning-tree) topology. The switches running in a stacked configuration always have to run the same firmware, which means that in case of a firmware upgrade the network manager has to implement the new firmware on all stack-members at the same time, resulting in an outage of the entire stack. The alternative is to have different logical switches, but then one of the used links will have to be blocked to ensure a loop-free topology (which can partially be overcome by using Multiple Spanning Tree or Cisco's proprietary per VLAN spanning tree. Spanning Tree Protocol is relatively slow in convergence, which can result in periods that traffic can't be forwarded over the network - and thus leads to outages of the applications.

VLT should address all these issues, making it possible to create a loop free redundant network topology without using the Spanning Tree Protocol. An example configuration how it works can be found on the Blog Geslinux written by Grzegorz Witkowski

== 3Com ==
Prior to supporting standardized IEEE 802.1Q tagging, 3Com used proprietary Virtual LAN Trunking (VLT). 3Com VLT supported VLAN IDs 1–16 with 15 being reserved for Autoselect VLAN Mode (where a VLAN server decides port membership) and 16 reserved for Spanning Tree Protocol.

== See also ==
- IEEE 802.1aq (Shortest Path Bridging)
- Multi-chassis link aggregation group
- TRILL (Transparent Interconnection of Lots of Links)
- Virtual PortChannel - the Cisco (Nexus) and Dell Networking (DNOS6.x) proprietary implementations of MC-LAG
