= Virtual Switching System =

Cisco proprietary network virtualisation technology

Virtual Switching System (VSS) is a Cisco proprietary network virtualisation technology that aggregates two physical Ethernet switches into a single logical switch for enhanced redundancy, scalability, and simplified management in enterprise and data centre environments. Introduced in 2008, VSS primarily supports Cisco Catalyst 4500, 6500, and 6800 series switches, allowing them to operate as one virtual entity with a shared control plane, data plane, and management interface. This technology reduces protocol overhead, eliminates spanning tree loops, and provides sub-second failover, making it suitable for high-availability Layer 2 and Layer 3 networks.

As of 2025, VSS remains in use for legacy deployments, though Cisco has transitioned to newer technologies like StackWise Virtual for Catalyst 9000 series switches.

== Background ==
VSS was developed by Cisco to address limitations in traditional multi-chassis setups, such as the need for Spanning Tree Protocol (STP) to prevent loops and the complexity of managing multiple switches. It was introduced in 2008 for the Catalyst 6500 series, enabling two chassis to form a virtual switch via a high-speed Virtual Switch Link (VSL). The VSL, typically using 10 Gigabit Ethernet or higher, synchronises configuration, state, and forwarding tables between the switches.

VSS operates with one switch as the active virtual switch (handling control plane functions like routing protocols) and the other as standby, though both actively forward data traffic. This design supports Multi-Chassis EtherChannel (MEC), where links from both chassis connect to downstream devices as a single bundle, eliminating STP blocking ports.

Support was later extended to the Catalyst 4500 series with Supervisor Engine 7-E/7-LE (from Cisco IOS XE 3.4.0SG) and 6800 series. VSS requires identical hardware pairs and compatible software versions, with configuration involving domain IDs and switch priorities.

== Components ==
Key elements of VSS include:

- Virtual Switch Link (VSL): A special EtherChannel (up to 8 links) connecting the two chassis, carrying control traffic, data, and synchronisation. It uses Link Aggregation Control Protocol (LACP) for redundancy.
- Virtual Switch Domain: A unique identifier (1–255) grouping the switches, preventing misconfigurations.
- Switch Priority and Roles: Configured via commands like switch virtual domain <ID> switch <1|2> priority <value>, determining active/standby roles.
- Multi-Chassis EtherChannel (MEC): Allows load balancing across both chassis to connected devices, treating them as one switch.

VSS uses a single IP address for management and a virtual MAC address derived from the active switch.

=== Configuration ===
Basic VSS configuration on Catalyst 6500/4500 series involves the following steps: 1. Enabling VSS mode on both switches with switch virtual domain <ID> switch <1|2>. 2. Configuring VSL ports (e.g., TenGigabitEthernet interfaces) and forming the EtherChannel. 3. Setting priorities and reloading the switches. 4. Verifying with commands like "show switch virtual" and "show switch virtual link".

For example, on the active switch, the switch converts to virtual mode, followed by domain setup. Cisco IOS XE 3.4.0SG or later is required, with ROMMON updates for the 4500 series.

== Performance ==
=== Benefits ===
VSS provides several advantages:

- Simplified Management: A single configuration point reduces operational complexity and errors.
- Increased Bandwidth and Scalability: Doubles port density and forwarding capacity without STP overhead.
- High Availability: Sub-second failover (typically 1–3 seconds) with nonstop forwarding during switch failures or upgrades.
- Loop Prevention: Eliminates STP by treating the pair as one switch, reducing convergence time.

It supports features like In-Service Software Upgrades (ISSU) for minimal downtime.

=== Limitations ===
- Limited to two chassis (no multi-chassis stacking beyond pairs).
- Hardware-specific: Requires compatible supervisors (e.g., Sup720 for 6500, Sup7-E for 4500); not supported on Catalyst 9000 without StackWise Virtual.
- Potential single point of failure if VSL fails, though LACP provides redundancy.
- End-of-life for some supported models (e.g., 6500 series).

Common issues include VSL mismatches or licence requirements for advanced features.

=== Comparative technologies ===
- StackWise Virtual: Cisco's successor for the Catalyst 9000 series, supporting similar benefits with modern hardware.
- Virtual Port Channel (vPC): For Nexus series, enabling multi-chassis LACP without full virtualisation.
- Cisco Virtual Networking: A broader suite including Nexus 1000V for hypervisor integration.

Comparison with similar technologies
Technology	Vendor	Max Chassis	Key Feature	STP Required?	Successor/Alternative
VSF VSX	HPE-Aruba		virtualization technology to create a cluster of two		
VSS	Cisco	2	Unified control plane, VSL	No	StackWise Virtual
vPC	Cisco	2+ (in domains)	Peer link for sync	Yes (optional)	ACI Multi-Site
MLAG	Multi-vendor (e.g., Arista, Juniper)	2+	Open standard, no proprietary links	Yes	EVPN-VXLAN
StackWise	Cisco	Up to 9	Stacking via cables, single IP	No	StackWise Virtual
MC-LAG	Juniper	2	LACP-based	Yes	QFX Virtual Chassis

VSS unifies control planes, unlike vPC, which maintains separate control planes.

== See also ==
- Spanning Tree Protocol
- Link aggregation
- Network switch
