= Force10 =

Computer networking company

Force10 Networks
- Industry: Network switches
- Founded: nCore Networks
- Founder: PK Dubey, Naresh Nigam and Som Sikdar
- Defunct: August 2011
- Fate: Acquired by Dell
- Headquarters: San Jose, California, United States
- Area served: worldwide
- Parent: Dell
- Website: www.force10networks.com

Dell Force10 (formerly nCore Networks, Force10 Networks), was a United States company that developed and marketed 10 Gigabit and 40 Gigabit Ethernet switches for computer networking to corporate, educational, and governmental customers. It had offices in North America, Europe, and the Asia Pacific region.

In August 2011, Dell completed the acquisition of Force10 and changed the name to Dell Force10. In mid 2013, the Force10 designation was dropped from the products in favor of the data center networking line of the Dell Networking brand, and some of the other product lines were sold.

== History ==
=== Founding ===
The company was founded by PK Dubey, Naresh Nigam and Som Sikdar. It was named by founder Som Sikdar, an avid sailor, after Beaufort Force 10 (Storm, Whole gale) on the Beaufort scale for wind speeds, indicating a storm with high speed winds, and matched their focus on 10 Gigabit Ethernet switching and routing products.

=== Acquisition ===
In January 2009, Force10 was acquired by Turin Networks (Founded by Philip Yim), which had previously purchased Carrier Access Corporation and White Rock Networks. Carrier Access Corporation itself had previously purchased Mangrove Systems and White Rock Networks had previously purchased Seranoa Networks.

On July 20, 2011 Dell announced it intended to fully acquire Force10 for an undisclosed amount. With the acquisition, Dell offered products for the data center where Dell focuses on the Ethernet switches. Dell Force10 continued to offer their non-Ethernet backhaul and metro-access platforms as well.

Telmar Network Technology of Plano, Texas, announced the acquisition of the Force10 Turin transport product lines from Dell in May, 2013, and has resumed support and development of the Traverse, TraverseEdge, TransAccess, TransNav, MasterSeries, Adit, Wide Bank, and Broadmore products. Telmar Network Technology, Inc. is a wholly owned subsidiary of Jabil Circuit, Inc. of St. Petersburg, FL.

iQor of St. Petersburg, FL, announced, in December 2013, the acquisition of the Jabil/Telmar Network Technology Aftermarket Services business, including the extended life products (from Alcatel, DECS, Force10/Turin, Transport Access products) and all of Telmar Network Technology. It continued support and development of the Traverse, TraverseEdge, TransAccess, TransNav, Adit, WideBank, and Broadmore products supporting Telecommunications companies worldwide in all applications from Digital cross connect system (DCS), SONET/SDH Optical transport to network access.

== Products ==
Force10 Networks has several product lines: Ethernet switches are marketed in four series, and other networking equipment for telecommunication providers and metropolitan networks:

- Ethernet switches
- Traverse series: Multiservice transport switches: Chassis based multi service platform offering SDH/SONET services, carrier Ethernet and Digital cross connect system, or cellular services. The chassis range from 6 to 20 slots with up to 95 Gbps per shelf,
- Master series: a backhaul platform for mobile/cellular networks. The Master series exists as a two-slot (1 Rack unit high) or a 3 RU - eight slot chassis offering backhaul services for 2G to 3G GSM network
- Axxius platform: a backhaul platform for both GSM and UMTS cellular networks over E1 {SDH} or T1 (SONET) network,
- Adit 600: Access platform for carrier grade (IP) networks offering an access platform for telecommunication providers to give their customers generic access to their NextGen network, and
- TransNav: software for the management of metropolitan area networks.

=== Ethernet switches ===
The main product line for Dell Force10 was Ethernet switches divided into four product series:

- Z series: Datacenter distributed core switches: 1 model, the Z9000, 2 RU high with 40 Gbit/s QSFP+ Ethernet ports for datacenter usage offering 2,5 Tbit/s switching capacity on 32 port at 40 Gbit/s or up to 128 ports at 10 Gbit/s using QSFP+ - 4 SFP+ 10 Gbit/s splitters.
- C series: Datacenter/core chassis-based switches: 2 models, C150 (9RU) and C300 (13RU) for 1 and 10 Gbit/s
- E series: Virtualized core chassis-based switches. campus, office or datacenter aggregation/core switches: 3 models for 1 and 10 Gbit/s aggregation
- S series: Edge-switches: 8 models 1RU or 2RU for 1 and 10 Gbit/s Ethernet

In January 2002, Force10 released the E-Series E1200 switch/router, claiming line-rate 10 Gigabit Ethernet switching. Force10 Networks hoped to expand from LAN switching to midsize data centers and enterprise campus networks. Force10 products included the E-Series family of switch/routers, the C300 switch, the S-Series family of access switches and the P-Series security appliances.

In 2007 Force10 announced it had a patent relevant for 100 Gigabit Ethernet switching.

Force10 Networks uses NetBSD as the underlying operating system that powers FTOS (the Force10 Operating System). In 2013 the name FTOS will be replaced by DNOS as the generic operating system name for all Dell Networking portfolio. Force10 made a donation to the NetBSD Foundation in 2007 to help further research and the open development community.

From January 19, 2012, through mid-2013, Force10 products were available as Dell products and newly ordered products were sold with the Dell logo and colors.

=== S Series ===
The S series Ethernet switches offered 1 Gbit/s, 10 Gbit/s, and 40 Gbit/s ports in 1U or 2U form factor. The S-series start at the S25 series with 24 1 Gbit/s ports with (S25V) Power over Ethernet, S25N copper ports or S25V fibre/SFP ports. Apart from that the switches offer several uplink options The S50 series is very similar to the S25 except that the S50 offers 48 ports.

Following the S25 and S50 are several types as S55 and S60, also offering 1 Gbit/s access ports and 10 Gbit/s uplink ports, where each model has a speciality, such as low latency or deep data-buffers (S60).

The top of range switches are the S4810 (fiber) or S4820 (copper) with 48 x 10 Gbit/s SFP+ (S4810) or 10GBASE-T (S4820) and 4 QSFP+ 40 Gbit/s uplink ports. The S4800 series are marketed as distribution switches for both datacenter as campus networks for large networks or (collapsed) core switches for smaller networks. The S4800 series switches can be stacked using either 10 Gbit/s or 40 Gbit/s ports using fiber links or copper/twinax based direct attached ports. The pass-through latency ranges from 800 nanoseconds for the S4810 to 3.3 microseconds for the copper-based S4820. The S4810, S4820 and the MXL or M-I/O switches use the Broadcom Trident+ ASIC. This is the same ASIC as used in the Dell PowerConnect 8100 series but running the FTOS operating system, while the PowerConnect 8100 series runs a Broadcom built firmware.

In June 2013 the S5000 series switches were announced. This switch was the first switch to display the new brand name Dell Networking and the new name for FTOS: Dell Networking Operating System or DNOS.

Dell Force10 also offers a FTOS based blade switch: Force10 MXL 10/40 Gbit/s switch for their M1000e blade enclosure, available since the second half of 2012. The MXL switch is a S4810 switch in chassis form-factor offering 32 internal 10 Gbit/s 10GBASE-KR ports, 2 external 40 Gbit/s (uplink or stack) ports and 2 expansion slots for 2 ports QSFP+ 40 Gbit/s ports or 4 port 10 Gbit/s SFP+ or 10GBaseT copper ports for uplinks or stacking.

Apart from the MXL multi-layer switches Dell also offers the IO Aggregator offering 32 x 10Gbase KR internal ports and 2 x 40 Gbit/s QSFP+ uplink ports and 2 slots for either dual-port QSFP+ or quad port SFP+ fiber or 10GBaseT copper uplink ports

All Dell Force10 series Ethernet switches ran the FTOS or Force10 Operating System, but some switches are compatible with Open Compute Project Open Network Linux.

== Architecture ==
All 10 Gbit/s products, except for the E-series, used the Broadcom Trident+ ASICs or other Broadcom-based Asics for the 1 Gbit/s models. The E-series used a Force10 proprietary ASIC. All layer2 / layer3 switches in a spine/leaf architecture. This architecture is used within a switch, where the communication goes via the internal backplane and the concept of the Z-series uses the same system for the distributed core between the switches. The switches that offer 40 Gbit/s interfaces can use these ports for 40 Gbit/s switch to switch links or split such a link in 4 x 10 Gbit/s direct attached links or fibre optic cable to other switches or 10 Gbit/s NIC's

=== Chassis switches ===
The Z-series and S-series are 1 RU or 2 RU stand-alone switches where the E- and C-series are chassis-based switches. The chassis-based switches all use a 100% passive backplane: according to the company this results in a backplane that is more energy efficient and allows to use the same backplane for much higher speeds: the company uses the same backplane when the maximum speed of ports was 10 Gbit/s as the current 40 Gbit/s and is ready for 100 Gbit/s. The backplane designed for their Terascale switches in 2004 is the same as the Exascale systems in 2012. The clockspeed used on the backplane was governed by the routing or switching-modules, allowed by the lack of any active components on the backplane.

=== Power consumption ===
The chassis based datacenter core-switches (E-series) uses far less power then direct competitors like the Cisco Nexus 7000 or the Juniper EX8216: fully utilized with 1 Gbit/s ports the Force10 E1200i uses 4.77 Watt per Gbps throughput where the Nexus uses 9.28 Watt and Juniper 6.15. Similar differences can also be seen when using all 10 Gbit/s ports (F10: 3.34 Watt per Gbps, Nexus: 7.59 Watt and Juniper 4.69 Watt]

== Customers ==
Force10 customers include enterprises in industries such as media, financial services, oil and gas, Web 2.0, and gaming. Service providers, including Internet exchanges, wholesale providers, cable operators, and content delivery providers. Force10 customers include Microsoft, Google, Facebook, LexisNexis, Zynga, Level(3), TATA Communications (formerly VSNL, Teleglobe), Mzima Networks, Stealth Communications, Yahoo!, isoHunt, Sega, NYSE Euronext, Veritas DGC, Equinix, CERN, NOAA, University College London Networks Research Group, and the Baylor College of Medicine.

== See also ==
- Digital cross connect system
