= Multi-chassis link aggregation group =

Type of link aggregation group optimised for redundancy

A multi-chassis link aggregation group (MLAG or MC-LAG) is a type of link aggregation group (LAG) with constituent ports that terminate on separate chassis, primarily for the purpose of providing redundancy in the event one of the chassis fails. The IEEE 802.1AX-2008 industry standard for link aggregation does not mention MC-LAG, but does not preclude it. Its implementation varies by vendor; notably, the protocol for coordination between chassis is proprietary.

== Background ==
A LAG is a method of inverse multiplexing over multiple Ethernet links, thereby increasing bandwidth and providing redundancy. It is defined by the IEEE 802.1AX-2008 standard, which states, "Link Aggregation allows one or more links to be aggregated together to form a Link Aggregation Group, such that a MAC client can treat the Link Aggregation Group as if it were a single link." This layer 2 transparency is achieved by the LAG using a single MAC address for all the device’s ports in the LAG group. LAG can be configured as either static or dynamic. Dynamic LAG uses a peer-to-peer protocol, called Link Aggregation Control Protocol (LACP), for control. This LACP protocol is also defined within the 802.1AX-2008 standard.

== Multi-chassis ==
MC-LAG adds node-level redundancy to the normal link-level redundancy that a LAG provides. This allows two or more nodes to share a common LAG endpoint. The multiple nodes present a single logical LAG to the remote end. Note that MC-LAG implementations are vendor-specific, but cooperating chassis remain externally compliant to the IEEE 802.1AX-2008 standard. Nodes in an MC-LAG cluster communicate to synchronize and negotiate automatic switchovers in the event of failure. Some implementations may support administrator-initiated switchovers.

The diagram here shows four configurations:

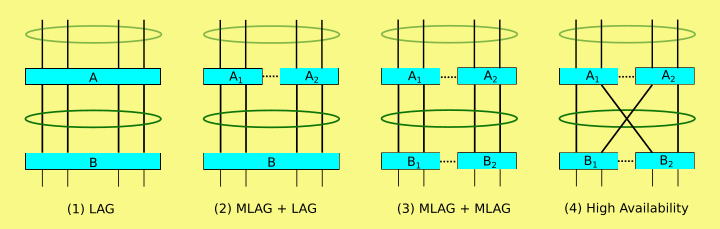
Illustration comparing LAG to high-availability MLAG

1. Switches A and B are each configured to group four discrete links (as indicated in green) into a single logical link with four times the bandwidth. Standard LACP protocol ensures that if any of the links go down, traffic will be distributed among the remaining three.
2. Switch A is replaced by two chassis, switches A_{1} and A_{2}. They communicate between themselves using a proprietary protocol and are thereby able to masquerade as a single virtual switch A running a shared instance of LACP. Switch B is not aware that it is connected to more than one chassis.
3. Switch B is also replaced by two chassis B_{1} and B_{2}. If these switches are from a different vendor, they may use a different proprietary protocol between themselves. But virtual switches A and B still communicate using LACP.
4. Crossing two links to form an X makes no difference logically, any more than crossing links in a normal LAG would. However, physically, it provides much improved fault tolerance. If any of the switches fail, LACP reconfigures paths in as little as a few seconds. Operation continues with paths existing between all sources and destinations, albeit with degraded bandwidth.

== Implementations ==
The following table lists known vendor implementations of MC-LAG, all of which are proprietary.

Vendor	Implementation name
ADVA Optical Networking	MC-LAG
Arista Networks	MLAG
Aruba Networks (formerly HP ProCurve)	Distributed Trunking under Intelligent Resilient Framework switch clustering technology
Avaya	Distributed Split Multi-Link Trunking
Ruckus Networks (formerly Brocade)	Multi-Chassis Trunking
Ciena	MC-LAG
Cisco Catalyst 6500	Multichassis Etherchannel (MEC) - Virtual Switching System (VSS)
Cisco Catalyst 3750 (and similar)	Cross-Stack EtherChannel
Cisco Catalyst 9000	StackWise Virtual
Cisco Nexus	Virtual PortChannel (vPC), where a PortChannel is a regular LAG
Cisco IOS XR	mLACP (Multichassis Link Aggregation Control Protocol)
Cumulus Networks	MLAG (formerly CLAG)
Dell Networking (formerly Force10 Networks, formerly nCore)	DNOS6.x Virtual Port Channel (vPC) or Virtual Link Trunking
Edgecore Networks	MLAG
Extreme Networks	MLAG (Multi Switch Link Aggregation Group)
Ericsson	MC-LAG (Multi Chassis Link Aggregation Group)
FS	MLAG
Fortinet	MC-LAG (Multi Chassis Link Aggregation Group)
H3C	Distributed Resilient Network Interconnect
Huawei	M-LAG
Juniper	MC-LAG
Lenovo Networking (formerly IBM)	vLAG
Mellanox Technologies	MLAG
MikroTik	MLAG
NEC	MC-LAG (Openflow to traditional network)
Nocsys	MLAG
Netgear	MLAG
Nokia (Formerly Alcatel-Lucent)	MC-LAG
Nortel	Split multi-link trunking
Nuage Networks (from Nokia)	MC-LAG; including MCS (Multi-chassis Sync)
Plexxi (now Aruba Networks))	vLAG
Pluribus Networks (now Arista Networks)	vLAG
UniFi	MC-LAG
ZTE	MC-LAG

== Alternatives ==
The link aggregation configuration is superior to Spanning Tree Protocol as the load can be shared across all links during normal operation, whereas Spanning Tree Protocol must disable some links to prevent loops. With Spanning Tree Protocol there is a potential delay when recovering from failure. Link aggregation typically can recover quickly from failure.

IEEE 802.1aq (Shortest Path Bridging) is an alternative to MC-LAG that can be used for complex networks.

TRILL (TRansparent Interconnection of Lots of Links) allows Ethernet to use an arbitrary topology, and enables per-flow pair-wise load splitting by way of Dijkstra's algorithm without configuration or user intervention.
