= Chassis management controller =

Hardware tool for systems management

A chassis management controller (CMC) is an embedded system management hardware and software solution to manage multiple servers, networking, and storage.

A CMC can provide a secure browser-based interface that enables an IT system administrator to take inventory, perform configuration and monitoring tasks, remotely power on/off blade servers, and enable alerts for events on servers or components in the blade chassis. It has its own microprocessor and memory and is powered by the modular chassis it is plugged into. The inventory of hardware components is built-in and a CMC has a dedicated internal network. The blade enclosure, which can hold multiple blade servers, provides power, cooling, various interconnects, and additional systems management capabilities. Unlike a tower or rack server, a blade server cannot run by itself; it requires a compatible blade enclosure.
