= FTOS =

Firmware family used on Force10 Ethernet switches

FTOS or Force10 Operating System is a discontinued firmware family used on Force10 Ethernet switches. It has a similar functionality as Cisco's NX-OS or Juniper's Junos. FTOS 10 is running on Debian. As part of a re-branding strategy of Dell, FTOS was renamed to Dell Networking Operating System (DNOS) 9.x or above, while the legacy PowerConnect switches use DNOS 6.x: see the separate article on DNOS.

== Hardware Abstraction Layer ==
Three of the four product families from Dell Force10 are using the Broadcom Trident+ ASIC's, but the company doesn't use the API's from Broadcom: the developers at Force10 have written their own Hardware Abstraction Layer so that FTOS can run on different hardware platforms with minimal impact for the firmware. Currently three of the four F10 switch families are based on the Broadcom Trident+ (while the fourth—the E-series—run on self-developed ASIC's); and if the product developers want or need to use different hardware for new products they only need to develop a HAL for that new hardware and the same firmware can run on it. This keeps the company flexible and not dependent on a specific hardware-vendor and can use both 3rd party or self designed ASIC's and chipsets.

The human interface in FTOS, that is the way network-administrators can configure and monitor their switches, is based on NetBSD, an implementation which often used in embedded networking-systems. NetBSD is a very stable, open source, OS running on many different hardware platforms. By choosing for a proven technology with extended TCP functionality built into the core of the OS it reduces time during development of new products or extending the FTOS with new features.

=== Modular setup ===
FTOS is also modular where different parts of the OS run independently from each other within one switch: if one process would fail the impact on other processes on the switch are limited. This modular setup is also taken to the hardware level in some product-lines where a routing-module has three separate CPU's: one for management, one for L2 and one for L3 processing. This same approach is also used in the newer firmware-families from Cisco like the NX-OS for the Nexus product-line or the IOS XR for the high-end routers (the Carrier Routing Systems) from Cisco. (and unlike the original IOS: processes under IOS aren't isolated from each other). This approach is regarded not only a way to make the firmware more resilient but also increases the security of the switches.

== Capabilities ==
All FTOS based switches offer a wide range of layer2 and layer3 protocols. All features are available on all switches: some switch models (in the S-series) offer an additional license for layer3 or routing: this additional license is NOT required to use that protocol, but only required to get support from the Dell Force10 support department on using these features. All interfaces on FTOS running switches are configured as a layer3 interface and by default shutdown. To use such an interface as an Ethernet switchport you need to configure it as such (with the command "switchport") and then enable that port using "no shutdown".

=== Layer2 capabilities ===
All standardized Ethernet standards are supported by switches running FTOS including: Spanning Tree Protocol and RSTP, VLAN and the IEEE 802.1Q standards, QinQ or IEEE 802.1ad, Link Layer Discovery Protocol and LLDP MED. The S-series switches ending with a V and some of the E-series line-cards support Power over Ethernet or PoE with the standards for this protocol.

=== Layer3 capabilities ===
As mentioned above, by default an interface on a switch running FTOS are configured as a layer3 port. All FTOS switches are thus routers with many interfaces that can (and most often are) reconfigured into a layer-2 Ethernet switch.

All FTOS switches run at least the following routing protocols: Routing Information Protocol and RIP version 2, OSPF, IS-IS and Border Gateway Protocol version 4.

== Management Interface ==
Switches running FTOS can only be configured using a command-line interface or CLI: FTOS doesn't offer a web-based Graphical user interface. Initial configuration is done via the console port using either a straight-through or roll-over cable (depending on model) to a terminal on 9600 bit/s and some models also support an AUX port allowing remote management via a dial-in modem. Most switches have a standard serial port or offer a USB-B port. After initial configuration access to the cli is possible via telnet and/or SSH. FTOS based switches also support SNMP and file-transfer (FTOS upgrades and startup-configuration data) can be done via FTP, TFTP or Secure copy Most switches running FTOS offer a dedicated management interface where the IP routing to/from the management system is not part of the internal switching or routing system. Some S-series switches only offer in-band management using a physical router interface or a VLAN interface in layer-3 mode.

== Open Automation ==
Under the name OpenAutomation 2.0 Dell Networking switches running DNOS 9.x (the new brand-name for FTOS) offers a number of features under this name. These features include:

=== Smart Scripting ===
Dell Force10 switches support so called smart scripting. It is possible to develop scripts that run on the switches running FTOS. Both Perl and Python are supported as scripting languages to automate environment specific repetitive tasks or to build in custom behavior. Users who write such scripts are promoted to share these scripts with the user-community and make them available to other Force10/DNOS users. Force10 introduced the smart scripting in FTOS in 2010, following other vendors like Cisco for their Nexus product range.

=== Bare metal provisioning ===
Force10 switches support a bare metal provisioning option: if you need to deploy a number of similar switches you can put both (desired/latest) firmware release and standard user-specific configuration on a USB key: when deploying the switches you can insert the USB key, power-up the switch and it will automatically load the correct firmware and configuration. In combination with smart scripting someone can combine these features for a fully automated installation and configuration of new switches.

=== Virtual server networking ===
Part of the Open Automation platform are special features for the use of virtualization in your datacenter. Virtualization allows you to create complete (virtual) server-systems running on a standard hypervisor farm. This will create new challenges for networking in such a datacenter, support automated configuration of datacenter switches to connect newly created virtual servers. The open automation platform has several features to support this.

=== Network Automation ===
According to Dell the move to (server and datacenter) virtualization is one of the most important developments in the IT industry. According to this vendor the industry must prevent that this path leads to getting locked-in into specific vendors due to the use of proprietary technologies. The open automation framework is an open framework that doesn't rely on proprietary solutions.
