= PowerConnect =

Series of network switches

Dell PowerConnect
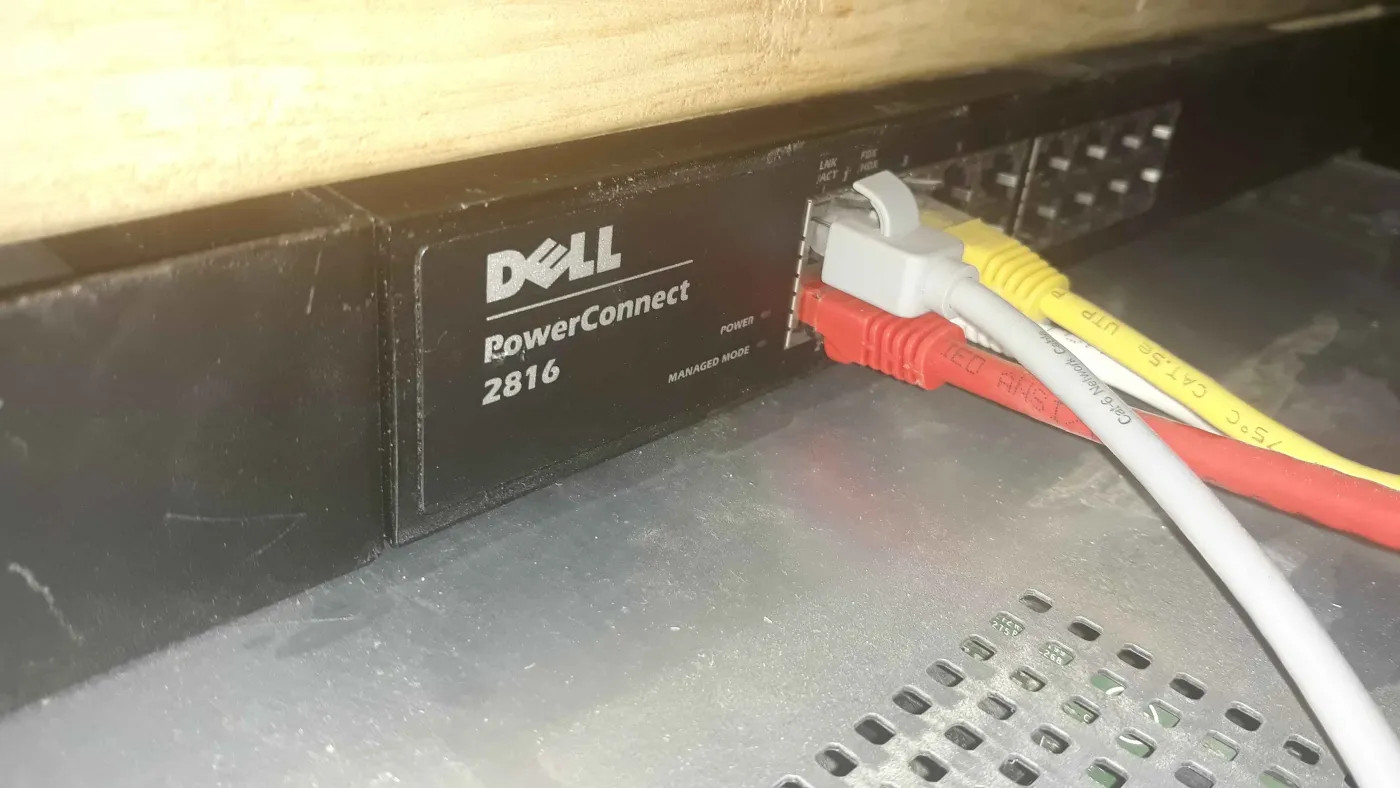
- Dell Powerconnect 2816
- Developer: Dell
- Type: Switch
- Released: 2001
- Discontinued: 2013
- Successor: Dell Networking

PowerConnect is a discontinued brand of business-oriented network switches produced by Dell. It consisted of two primary product groups: Classic switches with fabric and firmware based on Broadcom or Marvell; And those based on technology obtained from Force10 Networks after acquisition by Dell in 2011, which were oriented towards data center use. PowerConnect also included a W-series, which was a Wi-Fi platform.

In 2013 Dell re-branded their networking portfolio as Dell Networking, encompassing both the legacy PowerConnect products and the Force10-derived products.

== Product line ==
The brand name was first announced in July 2001, as traditional personal computer sales were declining. By September 2002 Cisco Systems cancelled a reseller agreement with Dell. Previously under storage business general manager Darren Thomas, in September 2010 Dario Zamarian was named to head networking platforms within Dell.

PowerConnect switches were available in pre-configured web-managed models as well as more expensive managed models.

As of 2013 there was not a single underlying operating system. The models with a product number up to 5500 ran on a proprietary OS made by Marvell while the Broadcom powered switches ran on an OS based on VxWorks. With the introduction of the 8100 series the switches were to run on DNOS or Dell Networking Operating System which is based on a Linux kernel for DNOS 5.x and 6.x.

Via PowerConnect W-series Dell offered a range of Aruba WiFi products.

The Powerconnect-J (Juniper Networks) and B (Brocade) series are not longer sold, except for the B8000e/PCM8428-K full FCoE switches. Most of these products were replaced by Force10 models.

=== 2200 and 2300 series ===
Models 2216 and 2224 were unmanaged, 10/100 Mbit/s Ethernet over twisted pair switches, with 16 and 24 ports each, respectively. They were discontinued. The PowerConnect 2324 was similar to 2224, but includes 2 Gigabit Ethernet ports for uplink or server purposes.

=== 2600 series ===
The PowerConnect 2600 series included the 2608, 2616 and 2624. They are un-managed Gigabit Ethernet workgroup switches with all ports at 10/100/1000 MBit/s. The 2624 model features an SFP port for fiber uplinks. They too are discontinued.

=== 2700 series ===
The PowerConnect 27xx series of switchers were web-managed all-Gigabit workgroup switches (10/100/1000) with eight, 16, 24, or 48 ports respectively. Switches shipped in a plug-n-play unmanaged mode and can be managed via a graphical user interface. They are discontinued.

=== 2800 series ===
see Dell Networking - PowerConnect 2800 for details

PowerConnect 2808, 2816, 2824, and 2848 are dual-mode unmanaged or web-managed all-Gigabit workgroup switches (10/100/1000). 8, 16, 24, or 48 ports respectively. On the 2824 and 2848, there are an additional 2 Small Form-factor Pluggable (SFP) transceiver modules, for fiber-optic connectivity. Switches ship in a plug-n-play unmanaged mode and can be managed via a graphical user interface.

=== 3400 series ===
PowerConnect 3424, 3424P, 3448, and 3448P were fully managed 10/100 switches with gigabit uplinks. All have four Gigabit ports, two copper and two SFP modular, all of which may be used at once. The 3424 and 3424P have 24 10/100 ports, the 3448 and 3448P have 48. The 3424P and 3448P provide power over Ethernet on all 10/100 ports (PowerConnect 3448P requires EPS-470 for full 15.4 W on all ports simultaneously). The switches are stackable using the copper Gigabit ports. They were discontinued.

=== 3500 series ===
see Dell Networking - PowerConnect 3500 for details

PowerConnect 3524(P) and 3548(P) are managed 10/100 switches with gigabit uplinks and Power over Ethernet options for [applications such as Voice over Internet Protocol (VoIP), denoted on the models denoted with a "P" on the end of the part number. All switches in this family support resilient stacking and have management and security capabilities.

=== 5200 series ===
The PowerConnect 5200 series of managed switches comprised the 5212 (12 copper Gb ports and 4 SFP ports) and the 5224 (24 copper Gb ports and 4 SFP ports)

=== 5300 series ===
The PowerConnect 5316M was similar in software and function to other 53xx series switches but physically designed to fit one of the four IO bays in the 1855/1955 blade chassis. 16 ports, 10 of which are allocated to the 10 blade slots in the chassis, 6 are accessible via the back panel of the switch. It was discontinued.

The PowerConnect 5324 was a 24 port, all-Gigabit, fully managed switch. The last 4 ports are SFP capable. Generally very similar to the 3400 series. It was discontinued.

=== 5400 series ===
The PowerConnect 5400 series reached 'end of sales' in 2011 and are followed up with the 5500 series. Many features of the 5400 are now available on the 5500 series, but where the 5400 were certified for use with EqualLogic iSCSI arrays, the 5500 never passed the acceptance tests. The 5400 series offered 4 SFP ports for 1G fiber uplinks to a core or distribution layer and the 24 or 48 RJ45 ports are either normal 1G Ethernet or 1G Ethernet with PoE option.

- VoIP optimization and auto-configuration
- iSCSI optimization and auto-configuration
- IEEE 802.1X (Dot1x) port-authentication
- IEEE 802.1Q (Dot1q) VLANs, trunking and -tagging.

=== 5500 series ===
see also Dell Networking - PowerConnect 5500 for details on current portfolio.

PowerConnect 5500 series switches, the successor of the 5400 series, are based on Marvell technology. They offer 24 or 48 Gigabit Ethernet ports with (-P series) or without PoE. The 5500 have built-in stacking ports, using HDMI cables and the range offers standard two 10 Gb SFP+ ports for uplinks to core or distribution layer. All 5500 series models (5524, 5524P, 5548 and 5548P) can be combined in a single stack with up to 8 units per stack. The 5500 series uses standard HDMI cables (specification 1.4 category 2 or better) to stack with a total bandwidth of 40 Gbit/s per switch.

The 5500 series are often used as top-of-rack (ToR) switches and client access switches in wiring cabinets in offices or campus networks. The 5500P series are mainly client access switches connecting VOIP phones and (daisy chained or directly connected) workstations. The -P series are also used to power other devices than phones, such as WiFi access points, IP cameras or thin clients.

The 5500 series are stackable to combine several 5500-series switches into one virtual switch. The 5500 series switches are mainly designed to be pure layer 2 switches but it has some very basic layer 3 capabilities. Other standard features are enhanced VOIP support where the switch automatically recognizes connected VOIP devices and configure VOIP quality of service and a VOIP-VLAN. This feature will only work optimally in small VOIP networks. There is also iSCSI optimization and auto-configuration, though Dell does not support them with their EqualLogic family of storage arrays. The switch also supports IEEE 802.1X (Dot1x) port authentication. Although they were meant as the follow-up for the EqualLogic certified 5400 switches, the 5500's never passed the acceptance tests: problems with latency -especially in stacked setups- prevented certification. Although they can work in small EQL (and other iSCSI) SAN networks they should be seen as campus-access switches and not as SAN switches.

=== 6200 series (Kinnick and Kinnick 2) ===
see also Dell Networking - Managed Multi-layer Gigabit Ethernet switches for details on current portfolio.

The PowerConnect 6024 with 24 Gigabit Ethernet over twisted pair ports was announced in early 2004.

The PowerConnect 6024F was a 24 port, layer 3, all-Gigabit, fiber-optimized switch. It had 24 SFP ports, eight of which doubled as copper ports. This switch was capable of routing, with static routes, Routing Information Protocol (RIP), and Open Shortest Path First (OSPF). It was replaced by the PowerConnect 6224/6248 models.

The 6224 and 6248 switch was introduced in early 2007 as the logical follow-up of the 6024 switch. It had 24 (6224) or 48 (6248) Gigabit Ethernet ports and two sockets for 10 Gigabit Ethernet modules (with two ports per module) or stacking.

Many of the Dell PowerConnect offered "combination" ports: the last 4 ports on the switch are either copper (UTP/RJ-45) or fiber (SFP) ports: for example, the PC6224 offers 20 copper-only interfaces while ports 21-24 can be found twice on the front of the switch: as standard UTP ports and also as SFP slots, but one can only use one of them: by default the UTP port is enabled but when one inserts a SFP module in port 21-24 it switches over to fibre mode and the UTP link goes down. Any combo ports are always the highest 4 standard ports (21-24 on the PCxx24 models and 45–48 on PCxx48 models)

Features include 24/48 ports, Layer 3 routing, all-gigabit, fully managed (web+cli), stackable switch with up to 4 10 Gb ports. High availability routing, edge connectivity, traffic aggregation and VOIP applications all supported in the 62xx series. Flexible, high-speed stacking, fiber support and MS NSP Certification included.

The 6224 (P and F) and 6248P series switches are end of development: new firmware versions will only repair bugs, no new features are being developed for these switches. While other PowerConnect switches based on Broadcom hardware have firmware versions 4.x, the 6200 series continue to run on version 3.x and features introduced in the 4.x firmware are not available for the 6200 series switches.(note: this does NOT apply to the PCM 6220 blade-switch)

=== 7000 series ===
see also Dell Networking - Managed multi-layer Gigabit Ethernet switches for details on current portfolio.

The PowerConnect 7024 and 7048 were introduced April 1, 2011. They had the same ports as the 6224/6248, QoS features for iSCSI, and incorporate 802.3az Energy-Efficient Ethernet. The 7000-series offer the same type of ports: both the 1G on the front as optional 10G and stacking modules on the rear side. Unlike the 6200 series, firmware for the 7000 series does support new functionality via version 4.x and 5.x like their 10G brothers in the 8024 and 8100 series.

A variant with reversible air flow is available for top of rack data center applications. The 6000 series remained on the market. The PCT7000 series also offer an out-of-band management Ethernet interface. One can configure the switch to allow both in-band as out-of-band management. By default the oob interface allows management per webgui (http) and telnet, but also https and ssh can be enabled on both in-band as out-of-band management. The PCT7000 series can be stacked with other PCT7000's but also with the PCM6348 blade switch

=== 8000 series ===
The PowerConnect 8024 and 8024F were rack-mounted switches offering 10 Gigabit Ethernet on copper or optical fiber using Enhanced Small Form-factor Pluggable transceiver (SFP+) modules on the 8024F. On the 8024 the last 4 ports (21-24) are combo-ports with the option to use the 4 SFP+ slots to use fiber optic connections for longer-distance uplinks to core switches. On the 8024F the 4 combo ports offer 10GBASE-T copper-ports. The PCT8024 series also offers out-of-band management via an extra Ethernet port. This port only gives access to the management of the switch: it doesn't allow to route or switch (other) traffic over this connection. It is possible to configure a switch so that it allows both oob as 'in band' management when one assigns an IP address to a vlan interface one can manage the switch via that address. The oob interface allows http, https, telnet or ssh access

The 8024 can be used as pure layer-2 switch or as a layer-3 switch.

These switches were introduced in early 2010, in the same single rack unit (1U) size.

The rack-models reached end-of-sale in January, 2013..

With the firmware 4.2.0.4 and later available from December 2011, the Powerconnect 8024(-F) and the blade-versions PCM8024-k (thus NOT the discontinued PCM8024) can be stacked. Stacking is done by assigning (multiple) 10 Gb Ethernet ports as stacking ports. Up to six 80xx series switches can be stacked. Note that stacking is not supported using the 10GBASE-T combo ports on PCT8024F. One can mix PCT8024 and PCT8024-F in one stack, but it can't be combined with a PCM8024-k blade. The original PCM8024 did not support stacking

Also with the introduction of that firmware the switches now also support Fibre Channel over Ethernet via the added functionality FIP Snooping.

=== 8100 series ===
see also Dell Networking - PowerConnect 8100 for details on current portfolio.

The PowerConnect 8100 series switches announced in 2012 offered 24 or 48 ports on 10 Gb and 0 or 2 built-in ports for 40 Gb QSFP ports. All models also have one extension-module slot with either two QSFP 40 Gb ports, 4 SFP+ 10 Gb ports or 4 10GbaseT ports. It is a small (1U) switch with a high port density and can be used as distribution or (collapsed)core switch for campus networks and for use in the data center it offers features such as lossless Ethernet for iSCSI and FCoE, data center bridging (DCB) and iSCSI Auto-configure The PCT8100 series is a multi-layer switch that can be used as either a pure layer-2 Ethernet switch or as a "layer-3" switch with extensive IP routing functions. Most routing is done in hardware and can be done at (near) wire speed. Management can be done via the out-of-band Ethernet interface or in-band by connecting to one of the VLAN IP addresses. Management is possible via HTTP(s), telnet, SSH or even serial console cable.

Model	10GBASE-T (fixed)	SFP+ (fixed)	QSFP (fixed)	Number of modules	Maximum 10 Gb ports	Power consumption (watts)
8132	24	0	0	1	32	240
8132F	0	24	0	1	32	176
8164	48	0	2	1	64	395
8164F	0	48	2	1	64	220

Up to 6 units in the 8100 series can be stacked to form one logical switch and any type of interface (10 Gb or 40 Gb, fiber-optical or utp copper) can be used for stacking. Similar to the rack-switches PCT7000 and PCT8024 series the switch offers an out-of-band Fast Ethernet port for management as well as a serial console connection, required for initial configuration. The switch is built around the Broadcom Trident+ ASIC: the same ASIC as can be found in Cisco Nexus 5000 switches or Force10 models. The PowerConnect 8100 is initially released with firmware 5.0 of the switch-firmware which offers the same features as the PowerConnect 7000 and 8024 rack-switches and the different M-series Ethernet switches. The underlying operating system of the PCT8100 is based on Linux 2.6 where all other 'Broadcom powered' PowerConnects run on VxWorks.

=== M-series ===
The PowerConnect M-series switches are classic Ethernet switches based on Broadcom fabric for use in the blade server enclosure M1000e.

All M-series switches offer a combination of internal interfaces and external interfaces. The internal interfaces connect to the mezzanine card of the blade servers in the M1000e enclosure. These internal interfaces can be one or 10 Gbit/s. The M6220 offers a total of 20 interfaces: 16 internal 1 Gb interfaces and 4 external 1 Gb ports. Optionally two extension modules can be installed that offers 10 Gb Ethernet or stacking interfaces to stack multiple M6220 switches together as one virtual switch. The M6348 has 32 internal ports (2 per blade) and 16 external 1 Gbit/s ports. The M6348 can be stacked via CX4 modules and/or create 10 Gbit/s SFP+ uplinks. The M8024 series offer 10 Gb on all interfaces: the M8024-k has 16 internal 10 Gb ports, 4 SFP+ slots and the option to install a FlexIO module that can offer 4 SFP+ ports, 3 CX-4 or 2 10GBaseT copper interfaces. The M8024-k was announced in May 2011.

With the firmware upgrade announced in December 2011, the M8024-k is also a Fibre Channel over Ethernet (FCoE) transit switch that can extend an available FCoE fabric. The M8024-k uses FCoE Initialization Protocol (FIP) to perform functions of FC_BB_E device discovery, initialization and maintenance. The FIP snooping feature enables the M8024-k to link Dell M-Series blades to an external top-of-rack or end-of-row FCoE forwarding switch and provides FCoE connectivity to the servers. This feature, along with Internet SCSI optimization, iSCSI TLV, and DCBx discovery and monitoring, enables seamless 10GbE performance in an end-to-end data center solution. In addition, with the recent firmware release, up to 6 M8024-k switches can now be stacked and managed through a single IP. Stacking is done by assigning (multiple) 10 Gb Ethernet ports as stacking-ports.

Also under the M-series name Dell offers the Brocade Communications Systems M5424 8 Gb Fibre Channel switch and the M8428-k Converged 10GbE Switch which offers 10GbE performance, FCoE switching, and low-latency 8 Gb Fibre Channel (FC) switching and connectivity.

Other switches and I/O modules for the M1000e blade-enclosure are the Cisco Systems 3032 and 3130 switches and several pass-through modules that bring the internal interfaces from the midplane to the exterior to connect these server-NIC's to external switches

== Firmware ==
Dell PowerConnect switches are based on Marvell technologies or Broadcom hardware and each of them offer entirely different firmware types. All layer-2 Ethernet switches have a family or model number below the 6000 and are based on Marvell hardware. Each model has its own family of firmware with different CLI and GUI (the PCT5500 series offer very limited layer-3 options, but is mainly a layer-2 switch). The switches with a model-number above 6000 are based on Broadcom hardware. Although each switch has its own firmware images; the options and capabilities on these switches are the same or similar. The PCT6200 (rack) series continue to run in the major-release number 3: new features or capabilities released in the other switches under firmware 4 or 5 are not available for the PCT6200 series. All other switches that are based on Broadcom hardware run on major release 4 or 5.

=== Bootcode ===
All Powerconnect switches, including the 8100 series, have both bootcode and operational code where one can run older firmware versions on later bootcode. Bootcode is generally backward compatible: one can run firmware of a lower version then the boot-code version; when upgrading firmware one do NOT need to upgrade the boot-code unless specifically directed in the release note or by Dell support, but when downgrading one leave the newer boot-code in place.

On the level2 switches (Marvell based) the bootcode is delivered as a separate file that needs to be copied to one's switch. The multi-layer switches however have the bootcode and operational code distributed in one file: one download and (prepare to) activate the newer firmware and with a special command (update bootcode) the switch builds the new bootcode from the operational code information. It is always possible to run a newer firmware operational code on a previous bootcode unless specifically noted in the release notes. In this case, the upgrade will automatically update the boot code during upgrade. When updating a stack, it is a best practice to individually update the stack members using the update bootcode <unit> command. Letting the unit completely rejoin the stack before updating any other unit is strongly advised, although updating the units individually (not as part of a stack) is always the safest route.

Firmware releases are backwards compatible and one can have switches of the same model in one's network running on different firmware levels. Configuration files of older firmware can be used on the newest switches except for some small changes in configuration behavior that was introduced with introduction of firmware 4.0 and later versions.

=== Features ===
The Broadcom-based multi-layer switches offer a wide range of layer-2 and layer-3 options, and new features are added all the time. Until version 4.2 it wasn't possible to stack multiple 10 Gb switches and converged Ethernet (FCoE) capabilities for the 10 Gb switches was added in firmware version 4.1

In release 5.0 the switches will start to support private vlan's and Unidirectional Link Detection. On the management level Tacacs+ accounting was added.

== Management ==
All Powerconnect switches can be configured via either a built-in web-GUI or the command line interface or CLI (except for the entry-level layer 2 Powerconnects that only offer web-based configuration or can run in the un-managed mode). The Web GUI uses by default HTTP on port 80, but one can configure them to support HTTPS and/or change the HTTP port-number. For the CLI one can use the serial console cable and -for the M series blade switches- a virtual console via the CMC.

By default one can also access the CLI via telnet with an option to support SSH. Authentication can be done via either the local user-database, RADIUS or TACACS.

All switches do also support SNMP, and with each firmware release an up-to-date MIB is also released. Any SNMP based management tool can be used, but the company also releases their own management-platform Open Manage Network Manager, which is a limited edition of Dorado's RedCell application. A free version, which only allows the user to manage up to 10 network devices, is available on the firmware page of the respective switches.

=== B-, J- and W-series ===
The B-series and J-series were Dell branded versions of switches from Brocade Communications Systems and Juniper Networks respectively. The W-series is the wireless range from Aruba Networks

Due to the acquisition of Force10 all the PowerConnect-J series and nearly all of the PowerConnect B-series have been discontinued. Only the Brocade-based PC-B8000e and the blade version PCM 8428-k) full FCoE switches are still available (as are pure Fibre Channel switches). Also the Cisco Catalyst 3xxx switches for the M1000e enclosure are still available.

The normal (datacenter) Ethernet switches from Juniper and Brocade are now replaced by Dell Force10 models `` The W-series, which is the Aruba product line for enterprise-class WiFi switches will continue to be available and the available models are extended in the near future.

== Force10 ==
In July 2011 Dell announced the acquisition of Force10 Networks, another company that designed and marketed Ethernet switches. The deal completed on August 26, 2011. This led to speculation that relationships with other vendors such as Cisco and Brocade would change because they overlap the data center market. In September 2011 Dell announced plans to expand the staff from Force10 in San Jose, California and Chennai, India.
