= Cisco Nexus switches =

Series of network switches

The Cisco Nexus series switches are modular and fixed port network switches designed for the data center. Cisco Systems introduced the Nexus Series of switches on January 28, 2008. The first chassis in the Nexus 7000 family is a 10-slot chassis with two supervisor engine slots and eight I/O module slots at the front, as well as five crossbar switch fabric modules at the rear. Beside the Nexus 7000 there are also other models in the Nexus range.

All switches in the Nexus range run the modular NX-OS firmware/operating system on the fabric. NX-OS has some high-availability features compared to the well-known Cisco IOS. This platform is optimized for high-density 10 Gigabit Ethernet.

== The Nexus switching range ==
Cisco Nexus OS Software Defined Networking (SDN) allows the same policies that govern Identity and Access Management (IAM) to dictate levels of access to applications and data through a totally converged infrastructure not possible with legacy network and system access methods.

The Nexus 9000 is the high-end model in the Nexus range of datacenter switches. Other models are:

- Nexus 1000v virtual switch
- Nexus 2000 fabric extender
- Nexus 3000 series
- Nexus 4001 IBM Blade Center switch
- Nexus 5000 series
- Nexus 6000 series
- Nexus 7000 series modular datacenter switches
- Nexus 9000 series

=== Nexus 1000v ===
The 1000v is a virtual switch for use in virtual environments including both VMware vSphere and Microsoft Hyper-V It is as such not a physical box but a software application that interacts with the hypervisor so you can virtualize the networking environment and be able to configure your system as if all virtual servers have connections to a physical switch and include the capabilities that a switch offers such as multiple VLANs per virtual interface, layer-3 options, security features etc. Per infrastructure/cluster you have one VM running the Nexus 1000v as virtual appliance, this is the VSM or Virtual Supervisor Module and then on each node you would have a client or Virtual Ethernet Module (VEM) a vSwitch which replaces the standard vSwitch.

The VEM uses the vDS API, which was developed by VMware and Cisco together VMware announced in May 2017, vDS API support will be removed from vSphere 6.5 Update 2 and later. Therefore, Nexus 1000v can no longer be used. VMware KB https://kb.vmware.com/s/article/2149722 https://www.theregister.com/2017/03/31/vmware_to_end_support_for_thirdparty_virtual_switches/

Besides offering the NX-OS interface to configure, manage and monitor the virtual switch it also supports LACP link aggregation where the standard virtual switches only support static LAGs

The configuration of VEMs is done via the VSM NX-OS Command-line interface.

=== Nexus 1010 / 1010x / 1100x ===
The Virtual Supervisor Module or VSM would normally run as a virtual appliance in an ESX/ESXi cluster but it is possible to run the VSM on dedicated hardware: the Nexus 1010, 1010x and 1100. For organisations where there is a very strict boundary between network management and server management, network administrators can avoid the dependency on the VSM running as virtual machine within the ESX cluster. The capabilities and limitations of a VSM running on a Nexus1010 are the same as a VSM running as virtual appliance under ESX. A Nexus 1100 can host up to 14 VSMs and it also allows additional services such as a Network Analysis Module to be run.

=== Nexus 2000 series ===
The Nexus 2000 series are fabric extenders (FEX): top of rack 1U high system that can be used in combination with higher end Nexus switches like the 5000, 6000 or 7000 series: the 2000 series is not a stand-alone switch but needs to be connected to a parent and should be seen as a module or remote line card but then installed in a 19" rack instead of in a main switch-enclosure. The interconnection between this 'remote line card' and the 5000 or 7000 parent switch uses either proprietary interfaces (CX-1 for copper or the short or long range Cisco Fabric Extender Transceiver (FET) interfaces), or standard interfaces (Cisco SFP+ SR and LR fibre interface modules or SFP+ Twinax cables). In combination with the 5000/6000/7000 mother-switch you can create a so-called Distributed Modular System.

The 2000 series consists of 4 different models. Three models offer 24 or 48 Gbit/s only or Gigabit or Fast Ethernet copper interfaces and up to four 10 Gigabit uplink interfaces on copper or fibre. The Nexus 2232PP offers thirty-two 1/10 Gbit/s Ethernet and Fibre Channel over Ethernet (FCoE) interfaces. The Nexus 2248PQ offers forty-eight 1/10 Gbit/s Ethernet and FCoE interfaces.

For the HP BladeSystem C3000 and C7000 server blade chassis, the Cisco Nexus B22HP fabric extender exists. (October 2011)

The Fujitsu PRIMERGY BX400 and BX900 blade server chassis uses the B22F fabric extender. (July 2012)
For the Dell M1000e blade server chassis, the Cisco Nexus B22Dell fabric extender was released in January 2013, which is 2.5 years after the initially planned release. Due to a disagreement between Dell and Cisco, Cisco stopped development of the FEX for the M1000e in 2010

The Nexus B22FEX offer 16 x 10 Gbase-KR internal 10 Gbit/s link to each blade-server interface and up to 8 SFP+ ports for uplink with a Nexus 5010, 5548 or 5596 switch. The maximum distance between the FEX and the mother-switch is 3 kilometer when it is only used for TCP/IP traffic and 300 meter when carrying also FCoE traffic.

=== Nexus 3000 series ===
The model 3064 is currently the only Nexus switch in the 3000-series utilizing merchant silicon. The 1U rack-switch with 1, 10 and 40 Gbit/s Ethernet interfaces is designed for use in colo center. Offers layer 2 and layer 3 capabilities at wire-speed for all 64 interfaces running in 10 Gbit/s. Layer3 routing protocols supported include static routes, RIP v2, OSPF and BGP-4. The switch-fabric can switch 2.28 Tbit/s and forward up to 950 million packets per second. The switch is capable of building a route-table with up to 16000 prefixes, 8000 host-entries and 4000 multicast routes and up to 4096 VLANs are supported. On top of that a high number of ingress or egress ACLs can be configured.

The 3064 has a single fan tray, two replaceable power supplies on board and two separate out-of-band management interfaces. To connect the 3064 to the rest of the network the use of proprietary EtherChannel or Link aggregation using industry-standard LACP or IEEE 802.3ad is supported with up to 32 port-channels with each up to 16 physical interfaces.

The switch holds of 48 SFP+ for 1 Gbit/s or 10 Gbit/s Ethernet interfaces and four QSFP+ each handling 4 x 10 Gbit/s interfaces allowing for 40 Gbit/s over a single fibre-pair

=== Nexus 4000 series ===
The Nexus 4000 series consists of only the model 4001: a blade-switch module for IBM BladeCenter that has all 10 Gbit FCoE interfaces. This blade switch had 14 server-facing downlinks running on 1 Gbit/s or 10 Gbit/s and six uplinks using 10 Gbit/s SFP+ modules. For out-of-band management, three Ethernet interfaces are available: one external 10/100/1000 bit/s copper interface, one internal management interface for the AMM or Advanced Management Module and one in-band interface using the VLAN interface option. And this blade-switch also has a serial console cable for direct access to the CLI

At present only switches for the IBM blade systems are available. When the Nexus 4000 series were announced in 2009 it was expected that there would be Nexus 4001 series for IBM and Dell (and not HP) but in February 2010 it became clear that Cisco canceled the Nexus 4001d for the Dell M1000e

For the HP blade system Cisco released a Fabric Extender, which compares with the Nexus 2000 top-of-rack devices, but then in a blade-form factor. The FEX that was developed for the Dell blade system, which was due to be released in the summer of 2010 was dropped at the same time as the Nexus 4001d in February of that year

=== Nexus 5000 series ===
The Nexus 5000 series, a.k.a. N5K, is a range of 5 models 1U or 2U rack-switches offering 20 to 96 interfaces running on 1 or 10 Gbit/s Ethernet and 10 Gbit/s FCoE interfaces. They can be used with the above-mentioned Nexus 2000 series fabric extender. The 5000-series offer carrier-grade layer2 and layer3 switching as well as FCoE capabilities

The Nexus 5000 has 5 models:

==== Nexus 5010 ====
- A one rack-unit high switch with 20 fixed 10 Gbit/s supporting Ethernet, FCoE and DCB interfaces and one expansion port offering one of the following modules:

8 ports with 1, 2 or 4 Gbit/s Fibre Channel
6 ports with 1, 2, 4 or 8 Gbit/s Fibre Channel
4 ports with 10 Gbit/s FCoE or DCB and 4 ports offering 1, 2 or 4 Gbit/s Fibre Channel
6 ports offering 10 Gbit/s FCoE or DCB

- Nexus 5010 is End Of Life - http://www.cisco.com/c/en/us/products/collateral/switches/nexus-5000-series-switches/eol_c51-709037.html

==== Nexus 5020 ====
A two rack-unit high switch with 40 fixed 10 Gbit/s supporting Ethernet, FCoE and DCB and two expansion ports each offering one of the modules

- 8 ports with 1, 2 or 4 Gbit/s Fibre Channel
- 6 ports with 1, 2, 4 or 8 Gbit/s Fibre Channel
- 4 ports with 10 Gbit/s FCoE or DCB and 4 ports offering 1, 2 or 4 Gbit/s Fibre Channel
- 6 ports offering 10 Gbit/s FCoE or DCB

- Nexus 5020 is End of Life - http://www.cisco.com/c/en/us/products/collateral/switches/nexus-5000-series-switches/eol_c51-709037.html

==== Nexus 5548 ====
The 5548 comes in two sub-models: the 5548P and 5548UP

- Nexus 5548P switch: 1U chassis with 32 fixed non-unified ports and up to 16 additional ports using the expansion slot. The 5548 chassis can be the main fabric for the Nexus 2000 series fabric extenders. The interfaces in the expansion slots are:

- 16 port unified offering 1-10 Gbit/s SFP+ slot for Ethernet and FCoE OR 1,2,4 or 8 native fibre channel
- 16 port SFP+ 10 Gbit/s Ethernet and FCoE
- 8 ports SFP+ 10 Gbit/s Ethernet and FCoE plus 8 ports 1,2,4 or 8 native fibre-channel.

- Nexus 5548UP: also a 1U chassis with 32 fixed unified ports and up to 16 additional ports using the expansion slot. The difference between the 5548P and 5548UP is that the 5548Ps fixed (on board) SFP+ slots are non-unified there where the same SFP+ slots on the UP chassis are unified.

==== Nexus 5596 ====
The 5596 comes in two sub-models the UP and the T:

- Nexus 5596UP: a two-RU chassis with 48 fixed unified ports and up to 48 additional interfaces in three expansion slots. Capabilities of the 5596UP is same as the 5548UP but this switch is two RU high and supports three expansion slots
- Nexus 5596T: a two-RU chassis with 48 fixed ports (32 of 10G Base-T + 16 SFP+) and up to 48 additional interfaces in three expansion slots. 5596T supports the upcoming 10G Base-T ports on the fixed as well as expansion slots along with supporting any other generic expansion modules that are supported on 5596UP.

Next to the expansion modules all three Nexus 55xx switches offer the capability to insert a 160 Gbit/s layer-3 routing engine

==== Nexus 5672UP ====
The 5672UP comes in two variants, with 16 or 24 unified ports:

- Nexus 5672UP: 1RU switch with 48 SFP+ ports supporting 1/10 GbE with FCoE or 2/4/8 Gbit/s FC, and 6 QSFP ports supporting 40 GbE with FCoE
- Nexus 5672UP-16G: 1RU switch with 48 SFP+ ports supporting 1/10 GbE with FCoE or 2/4/8/16 Gbit/s FC, and 6 QSFP ports supporting 40 GbE with FCoE

==== Nexus 56128P ====
- Nexus 56128P: 2RU switch with 48 SFP+ ports supporting 1/10 GbE with FCoE, 4 QSFP ports supporting 40 GbE with FCoE, and two expansion slots
- Nexus 56128P Generic Expansion Module (GEM): 24 SFP+ ports supporting 1/10 GbE with FCoE or 2/4/8 Gbit/s FC, and 2 QSFP ports supporting 40 GbE with FCoE

=== Nexus 6000 series ===
The Cisco Nexus 6000 range contains two models, the 6001 model and the 6004 model. They can be used as layer2 and layer3 switches and can aggregate traffic from the Fabric Extenders (FEX) for different blade-server systems. Both models support either front to back or back to front airflow and they do support Fibre Channel over Ethernet in combination with a full FCoE switch (e.g. Nexus 5500 or Brocade 8000 switch (which is same as Dell PowerConnect 8000e or blade version PCM 8428-k)).

==== Nexus 6001 ====
The Nexus 6001 is a fixed 1 RU switch with 48 x 10 Gbit/s and 4 x 40 Gbit/s interfaces for uplinks. It can operate as both layer2 and as layer3 switch and in combination with FEX (fabric extenders) you can aggregate up to 1152 ports at 1 Gbit/s or 10 Gbit/s. System speed is wire-speed at layer2 and 1.28 Tbit/s for layer3 operation.

==== Nexus 6004 & 5696Q ====
The 2nd model in the Nexus 6000 series is a modular chassis, 4 Rack units high. The basic chassis offers 48 fixed QSFP+ ports at 40 Gbit/s each, each can be split in 4 x 10 Gbit/s SFP+ ports. Besides the 48 QSFP+ ports the chassis can hold up to 4 expansion modules - each offering 12 additional 40 Gbit/s QSFP+ ports - thus in total up to 96 QSFP+ ports or 384 SFP+/10 Gbit/s ports and when aggregating FEX up to 1536 (blade)server ports at 1 or 10 Gbit/s. As with the 6001 layer 2/layer 3 operation is at line-rate and total switching capacity of a chassis is 7,68 Tbit/s. The Nexus 6004-EF switch is a modular device which provides the same features as the 6004 but with the use of expansion modules in all slots of the switch. The base configuration of the 6004-EF must have 2 x 12 port 40GbE expansion modules, delivering 24 ports of 40GbE or 96 ports of 10GbE. Additional capacity can be provided by installing further expansion modules.

For layer3 and FCoE operation additional licences are required

Cisco released the Nexus 6004X switch and renamed it to the Nexus 5696Q. Previously, the Nexus 6000 series was meant to be focused on the Cisco 40G aggregation products, and the 5500 and 5600 series on 10G. However, these switches mostly shared common hardware components, ASICs, and the same software images, so recently the Cisco decided to merge the product portfolios.

=== Nexus 7000 series ===
Although the Nexus 5000 had some modular capabilities and you can attach the Nexus 2000 fabric extender to the 5500 range, the Nexus 7000 is the real modular switch in the Nexus family with six versions: one 4 slot, one 9 slot, two 10 slot and two 18 slot switches. Unlike the other Nexus models, the 7000 series switches are the modular switches for campus core and data center access, aggregation and core. Some details on the models are detailed below. As with the Nexus 5000 series the Nexus 2000 Fabric Extenders can act as a remote line card on the 7000 series. 70xx and 77xx linecards and supervisor modules are not compatible.

==== Nexus 7004 ====
- 4 slots: 3-4 are line card slots, 1-2 are supervisor slots
- 7 RU height
- Supports 96 1 or 10 Gbit/s ports (48 per slot), 12 40 Gbit/s ports (6 per slot) or 4 100 Gbit/s ports (2 per slot), all non-blocking ports
- 1.92 Tbit/s system bandwidth
- 440 Gbit/s, 720 million pps (720 Mpps) per slot
- Air flow is side to rear (input on right)
- The chassis does not have fabric modules, the I/O modules connect directly through the backplane
- Up to 4 power supplies.

==== Nexus 7009 ====
- 9 slots: 3-9 are line card slots, 1-2 are supervisor slots
- 14 RU height
- Supports 336 1 or 10 Gbit/s ports (48 per slot), 42 40 Gbit/s ports (6 per slot) or 14 100 Gbit/sc ports (2 per slot), all non-blocking ports
- 8.8 Tbit/s system bandwidth
- 550 Gbit/s, 720 Mpps per slot
- Air flow is side to side (right to left)
- Up to 5 Crossbar Fabric Modules
- Up to 2 power supplies

==== Nexus 7010 ====
- 10 slots: 1-4 and 7-10 are line card slots, 5-6 are supervisor slots
- 21 RU height
- Supports 384 1 or 10 Gbit/s ports (48 per slot), 48 40 Gbit/s ports (6 per slot) or 16 100 Gbit/s ports (2 per slot), all non-blocking ports
- 550 Gbit/s, 720 Mpps per slot
- Air flow is front to back
- Up to 5 Crossbar Fabric Modules
- Up to 3 power supplies

==== Nexus 7018 ====
- 18 slots: 1-8 and 11-18 are line card slots, 9-10 are supervisor slots
- 25 RU height
- Supports 768 10 Gbit/s and/or 1 Gbit/s, all non-blocking ports
- Supports 768 1 or 10 Gbit/s ports (48 per slot), 96 40 Gbit/s ports (6 per slot) or 32 100 Gbit/s ports (2 per slot), all non-blocking ports
- 18.7 Tbit/s system bandwidth
- 550 Gbit/s, 720 Mpps per slot
- Air flow is side to side (right to left)
- Up to 5 Crossbar Fabric Modules
- Up to 4 power supplies

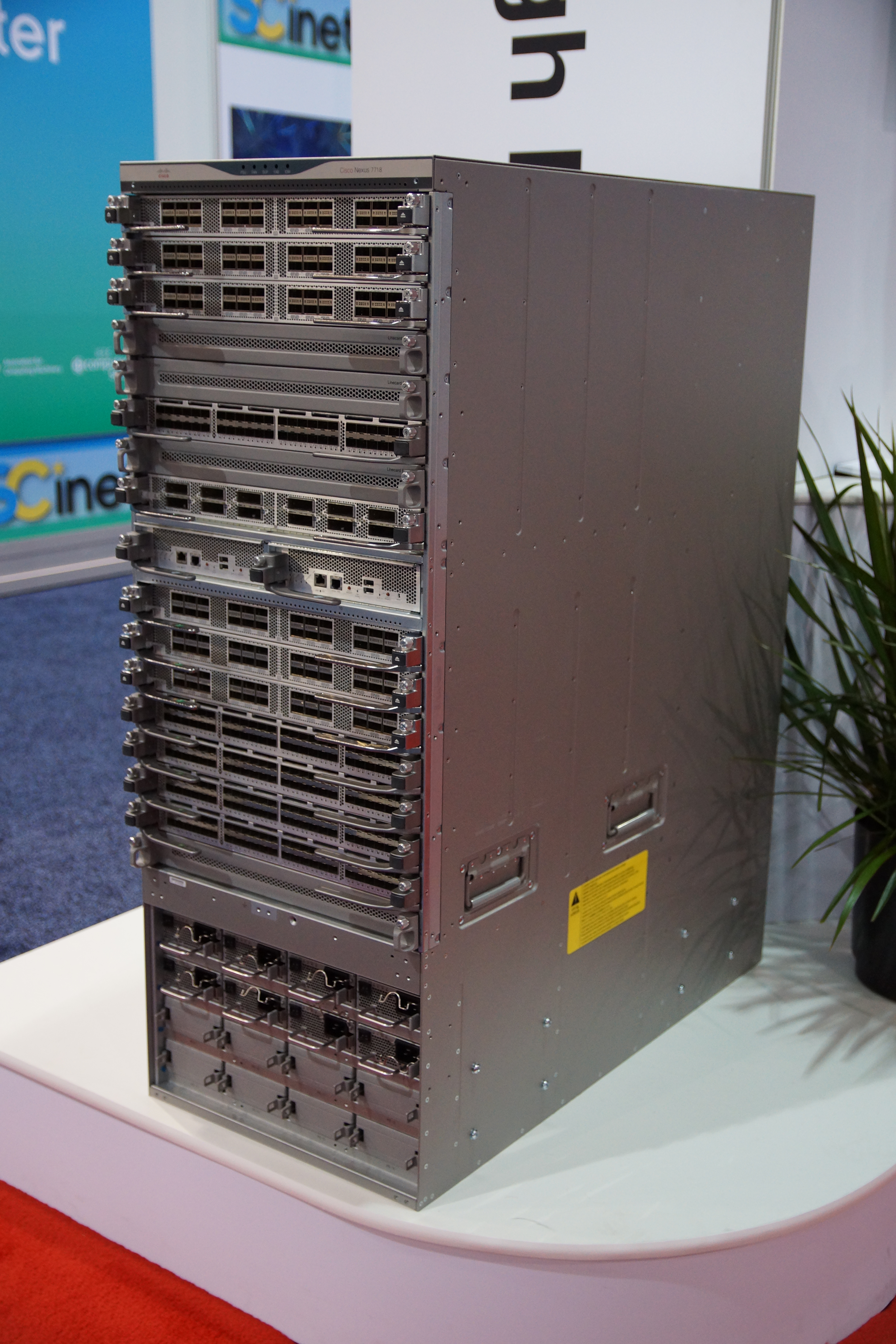
Cisco Nexus 7700 series

==== Nexus 7710 ====
- 10 slots: 1-4 and 7-10 are line card slots, 5-6 are supervisor slots
- 14 RU height
- Supports up to 384 10 Gbit/s ports, 192 40 Gbit/s ports or 96 100 Gbit/s ports, all non-blocking ports
- 42 Tbit/s system bandwidth (21 Tbit/s full duplex)
- 1.32 Tbit/s per slot
- Air flow is front to back
- Up to 6 switch fabric modules
- Up to 8 power supplies (3 kW each)
- 6 microsecond Latency

==== Nexus 7718 ====
- 18 slots: 1-8 and 11-18 are line card slots, 9-10 are supervisor slots
- 26 RU height
- Supports up to 768 10 Gbit/s ports, 384 40 Gbit/s ports or 192 100 Gbit/s ports, all non-blocking ports
- 83 Tbit/s system bandwidth (42 Tbit/s full duplex)
- 1.32 Tbit/s per slot
- Air flow is front to back
- Up to 6 switch fabric modules
- Up to 16 power supplies (3 kW each)

=== Nexus 9000 series ===
The Nexus 9000 series is a range of many models 2U to 21U rack-switches offering 60 to 2304 interfaces running on 100Mb, 1Gb, 10Gb, 25Gb, 40Gb, 100Gb, 400Gb Ethernet, 10/25/40 Gb FCoE interfaces. They can be used with the above-mentioned Nexus 2000 series fabric extender. The 9000 series provides converged Active Directory (AD), Network Standard Execution, (NSX) and Application Centric Infrastructure (ACI) using Software Defined Networking (SDN) in a modified Nexus operating system (Nexus OS ACI).

The Nexus 9000 has many models:

==== Nexus 9396PX ====
- A two rack-unit high switch with 48 SFP+ 10 Gbit/s supporting Ethernet, FCoE and DCB interfaces and one expansion port offering the modules

12 ports with 40 Gbit/s supporting Ethernet, FCoE or DCB

==== Nexus 93128TX ====
- A three rack-unit high switch with 96 fixed 1/10 Gbit/s supporting Ethernet, FCoE and DCB interfaces and one expansion port offering the modules

8 ports with 40 Gbit/s supporting Ethernet, FCoE or DCB

==== Nexus 9504 ====
- 4 line card slots
- 7 RU height
- Supports 576 10 Gbit/s and/or 1 Gbit/s, all non-blocking ports
- 15 Tbit/s system bandwidth

==== Nexus 9508 ====
- 8 line card slots
- 13 RU height
- Supports 1152 10 Gbit/s and/or 1 Gbit/s, all non-blocking ports
- 30 Tbit/s system bandwidth

==== Nexus 9516 ====
- 16 line card slots
- 21 RU height
- Supports 2304 10 Gbit/s and/or 1 Gbit/s, all non-blocking ports
- 60 Tbit/s system bandwidth

== End-of-Life Switches ==
Base Model	Form Factor	Variants	Available ports/Modules	Number of power supplies	Number/Type of supervisors	Expansion type	Sync	End-of-life (only major notices listed)	Comments
Nexus 4000 Series	Module	4001i		None	None			30-JUL-2020 - End-of-support	Blade module for IBM BladeCenter servers

== Current Switches ==
Base Model	Form Factor	Variants	Available ports/Modules	Number of power supplies	Number/Type of supervisors	Expansion type	Sync	End-of-life (only major notices listed)	Comments
Nexus 2000 Series	Fixed	2348; 2332; 2248; 2232; 2224; 2148	24 8P8C/2 SFP; 48 8P8C/4 SFP; 32 8P8C/4 SFP; 48 8P8C/6 SFP; 32 8P8C(1/10G)/8 SFP+ 48 SFP+/2 to 6 SFP+ 32 SFP+/8 SFP+		None	None	Series only behaves as FEX. Cannot be standalone	No EoL announcements to date	
Nexus 3000 Series	Fixed	3112; 3548; 3524; 3264; 3232; 3172; 3164; 3132; 3064; 3048; 3016	48 SFP+/4 QSFP+ 32 8P8C/4 QSFP+ 48 8P8C/4 QSFP+ 16 QSFP+ 48 8P8C/4 SFP+ 32 QSFP+ 64 QSFP+ 48 SFP+/4 QSFP+ 48 8P8C/6 QSFP+ 96 SFP+/8 QSFP+ 24 SFP+ 48 SFP+	Up to 2	None	None		Announced 2012 (3064PQ only); Announced 2015 (3016 only)	
Nexus 5000 Series	Hybrid	56128; 5696; 5672; 5648; 5624; 5596; 5548; 5020 (EoSale); 5010 (EoSale)	48 SFP+/6 QSFP+ 48 SFP+/4 QSFP+ 12 QSFP+ 24 QSFP+ Nothing Fixed/Expansion; 32 10GBase-T/16 SFP+/Expansion; 48 SFP+/Expansion; 32 SFP+/Expansion; 40 SFP+/Expansion	Up to 2	None	24 SFP+/2 QSFP+ 8 1/2/4 Gbit/s FC; 6 1/2/4/8 Gbit/s FC; 4 10 Gbit/s/4 1/2/4 Gbit/s FC; 6 10 Gbit/s FCoE or DCB	Can use Nexus 2000 series as FEX	Announced 2012 (5010 and 5020); Announced 2015 (5548P only); Announced 2018 (5548UP and 5596)	Several models have air flow direction options, Various Unified port options
Nexus 7000 Series	Module	7004; 7009; 7010; 7018; 7702; 7706; 7710; 7718	96 1/10 GE; 24 40 GE; 12 100 GE	Up to 2	2	SFP; SFP+ QSFP+		Announced Feb-2021 (7000 models); Announced Oct-2022 (7700 models)	
