= Exanet =

Former Israeli software company

Exanet, Ltd.
- Type: Privately held company
- Industry: Data storage devices / Computer Storage
- Founded: 2000
- Founder: Giora Yaron
- Defunct: February 2010
- Fate: Acquired by Dell
- Headquarters: Raanana, Israel
- Key people: Mark Weiner, CEO
- Products: ExaStore, ExaFS distributed file system, ExaSync. Now: FluidFS
- Website: www.exanet.com

Exanet, Ltd. was an Israeli software company that provided scalable network-attached storage software solutions to partners. Exanet software was hardware independent. Their clustered NAS software storage solution provided single-file system scalability, and was compatible with Linux, Mac, and Windows operating systems. After the company went into temporary receivership, on February 19, 2010 Exanet's intellectual property was acquired by Dell.

== History ==
Exanet was founded in 2000 by Giora Yaron and Yossi Ben-Shoshan, and raised $30 million in two rounds of venture capital funding.

In 2003, ExaStore started shipping its first products. In January 2006, Exanet joined the Intel Storage Community. In November 2006, Exanet introduced ExaStore-ICM, providing automated data storage and delivery services. In March 2008, Exanet introduced its "solution" products: ExaStore Clustered NAS system and ExaStore Clustered NAS Server. Exanet was headquartered in Israel with offices in the US, UK, Germany, France, Ukraine, and Japan. Investors included Eitan Wertheimer's Microdent Ltd., Evergreen Venture Partners, Coral Group, and LTG Development Capital.

On December 12, 2009, Exanet went into temporary receivership, after failing to secure an additional round of financing. The company had an estimated 80 employees.

=== Acquisition by Dell ===
In February 2010 the company IP was acquired by Dell Inc. for $12 million.

Dell continued development of the NAS capability, which was marketed as the Dell Fluid File System or FluidFS. This product comes as an appliance, where the controller running the software is a Dell PowerEdge server and the storage can be any of the three Dell storage product-lines: Dell PowerVault, EqualLogic or Compellent using iSCSI or Fibre Channel connections.

== Products ==
Exanet was an OEM provider of enterprise storage software called ExaStore. ExaStore had the following components:

- ExaStore software
- Intel-based servers (nodes)
- Standard Gigabit Ethernet or 10 Gigabit Ethernet networking components
- Fibre Channel attached disk array storage

=== ExaSearch ===
ExaSearch
- ExaSearch's logo
- Developer: Exanet
- Stable release: 4.5 / 2007
- Operating system: Microsoft Windows
- Type: Enterprise Search
- License: Proprietary
- Website: http://www.exanet.com/default.asp?contentID=192

ExaSearch is a search engine, which integrates with Exanet’s scalable, ExaStore, network attached storage (NAS) software, allowing customers to turn stored data into accessible information.

ExaSearch includes a search engine capable of searching multiple sources: file servers, email systems, groupware, databases and employee directories. It can process unstructured data and queries, and allows immediate access to newly generated content through real-time indexing. The product is designed to integrate with ExaStore software resulting in a clustered NAS solution combined with enterprise-class search capabilities.
