= Paula Long =

American software engineer and entrepreneur

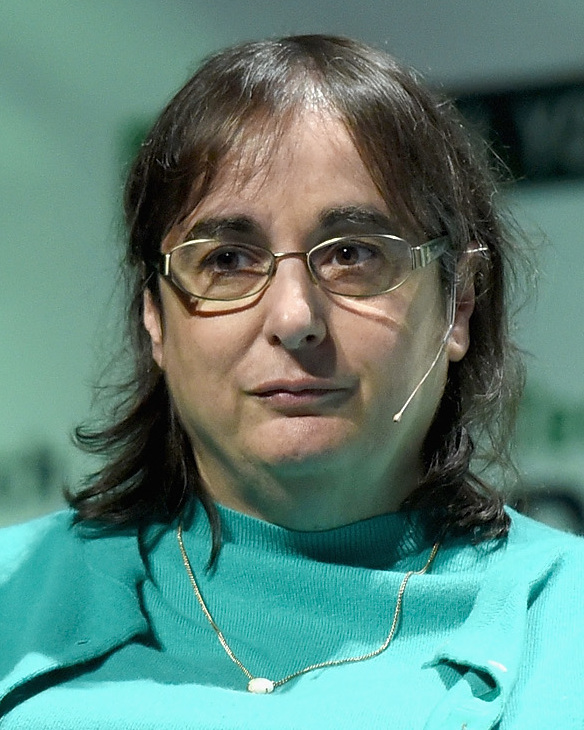
- Paula Long in 2015
- Born: Methuen, MA
- Occupations: Entrepreneur, software engineer
- Known for: Co-founder of DataGravity, co-founder of EqualLogic

Paula Long is an American software engineer and entrepreneur. She was CEO and co-founder of DataGravity and in 2001, she co-founded EqualLogic, which was later sold to Dell.

== Biography ==
Born in Methuen, Massachusetts, Paula Long grew up in Enfield, Connecticut. She received her bachelor's degree in computer science from Westfield State University in Westfield, Massachusetts.

Long began her career as a software engineer. She was a consulting software engineer in the UNIX operating system group at Digital Equipment Corporation before her move to the startup community. She worked at Bright Tiger Technologies in Acton, Massachusetts, where she was responsible for the ClusterCATS product line, a web management clustering product. In 1999, Bright Tiger was acquired by Allaire Corporation, and Long went on to work at Allaire in several engineering leadership positions. Long was the director of software at Iron Stream, which received seed funded in 2000 and closed during the dot-com meltdown.

In 2001, Long co-founded storage provider EqualLogic in Nashua, New Hampshire alongside Peter Hayden and Paul Koning. She was responsible for development of the EqualLogic product lines. In 2008, EqualLogic was acquired by Dell for $1.4 billion. Long remained at Dell as vice president of storage until 2010. After leaving Dell, Long worked as vice president of product development at Heartland Robotics for 9 months between 2010 and 2011.

In 2012, Long and John Joseph co-founded DataGravity, where she served as CEO. Located in Nashua, New Hampshire, the company produced security and data protection software for data storage systems. Long left DataGravity around June 2017. The assets of DataGravity were acquired by HyTrust in July 2017.

Long has served on several boards, including SugarSync and ClearSky Data. She holds patents in data storage, data analytics, data protection, data security and file systems. She's spoken at conferences such as Structure, TechCrunch Disrupt, Collision, MIT Start6, and RSA Conference.

== Awards ==
Long won the New Hampshire High Tech Council's Entrepreneur of the Year award in 2008. That same year, Long won the Ernst & Young Entrepreneur of the Year Award for the northeast region, and was also a national finalist for the same award.

In 2015, she received the “Women 2.0 Impact Builder Award” for her work helping women in technology.
