= DataGravity =

DataGravity Inc.
- Type: Private limited company
- Industry: Industry data management, Security software
- Founded: 2012; 14 years ago
- Founder: Paula Long; John Joseph
- Fate: Assets acquired by HyTrust
- Headquarters: USA
- Area served: Worldwide
- Website: www.datagravity.com

DataGravity Inc. was an American industry data management company, which produced security software. The company was founded in April 2012 by Paula Long and John Joseph.

The company focused on protection and security of the data stored on the array, and named this new type of storage as data-aware storage.

== History ==
DataGravity announced its first products at VMworld in 2014. It won Best of Show, and New Technology awards for the event. It began shipping their first products in October 2014.

It publicly changed its product strategy in February 2016 from data storage appliances to a software solution focused on behavioral data security. This product strategy change resulted in multiple rounds of layoffs.

Multiple reports use conflicting terminology about the final fate of the company.

Some reports say HyTrust acquired DataGravity.

Other reports, including a press release issued by HyTrust itself, say HyTrust acquired the assets of DataGravity after it was signed over to a liquidator.

HyTrust told Fortune that founder and CEO Paula Long left DataGravity a few weeks before the transaction was announced, and that co-founder John Joseph left some time before that.

According to some reports, DataGravity ceased day-to-day operations in June 2017, when it cancelled employee benefit plans and signed the company over to liquidator Barry Kallander of the Kallander Group. In one such report, correspondence from DataGravity President Barry Kallander states "The corporation was not sold — the assets of the company were....Unfortunately the common shares are worthless."

Conversely, DataGravity CTO David Siles was quoted as saying the company "did not shut down", and that the transaction "wasn't a fire sale. We were acquired because we complete a vision, add value, have customers who love what we do. Together we will offer a very compelling offering to the marketplace solving very pressing needs for many enterprises."

Approximately 20 former DataGravity employees joined HyTrust to support DataGravity's product integration, led by former DataGravity CTO David Siles.

DataGravity's products remain a part of HyTrust's portfolio under its CloudAdvisor suite.
