= Dell n Series =

Line of computers by Dell

The n Series is a Dell product line that does not ship with a pre-installed version of Microsoft Windows. Apparently prohibited from shipping computers without an operating system by an existing licensing agreement with Microsoft, Dell instead ships these systems with either the open-source FreeDOS operating system or the Ubuntu Linux distribution not preinstalled, but on install disks.

The company has come under fire for making the FreeDOS and Linux-powered machines no cheaper and more difficult to purchase than identical systems running Windows. Despite its technological advances, it is often criticized more than the average computing device.
