= Las Cimas =

American office complex in Travis County, Texas

Coordinates: 30.289°N 97.830°W

Las Cimas (Spanish: "Summit" or "Top") is an office complex in unincorporated Travis County, Texas, between Austin and West Lake Hills. The buildings, southwest of Downtown Austin, are about 300 yards (270 m) south of the southwest corner of Las Cimas Parkway and Texas State Highway Loop 360 (Capital of Texas Highway). It previously housed the headquarters of Dell and American Campus Communities.

Las Cimas II and III are owned by Spear Street Capital.

== History ==
Lincoln Property Company developed Las Cimas II and III in 2000 and 2001.

In 2000 Dell announced that it would lease 80,000 square feet (7,400 m^{2}) of space in the Las Cimas office complex to house the company's executive offices and corporate headquarters, which were moving from Round Rock, Texas. 100 senior executives were scheduled to work in the building by the end of 2000. In January 2001 the company leased the space in Las Cimas 2, located along Loop 360. Las Cimas 2 housed Dell's executives, the investment operations, and some corporate functions. Dell also had an option for 138,000 square feet (12,800 m^{2}) of space in Las Cimas 3. After a slowdown in business required reducing employees and production capacity, Dell decided to sublease its offices in two buildings in the Las Cimas office complex. In 2002 Dell announced that it planned to sublease its space to another tenant; the company planned to move its headquarters back to Round Rock once a tenant was secured. By 2003 Dell moved its headquarters back to Round Rock. It leased all of Las Cimas I and II, with a total of 312,000 square feet (29,000 m^{2}), for about a seven-year period after 2003. By that year roughly 100,000 square feet (9,300 m^{2}) of that space had been absorbed by new subtenants.

Challenger International Ltd. purchased Las Cimas II and III for $63 million in 2002. Challenger merged with CPH Investment Corp. in 2003, so its name changed to Challenger Financial Services Group Ltd. In 2004 Challenger put Las Cimas II and III (together they have 313,364 square feet (29,112.5 m^{2}) of space) for sale.

In 2006 Triple Net announced that it was selling Las Cimas II and III. At the time, Dell leased the entirety of both buildings and sublet them to several firms, including American Campus Communities, Keller Williams Realty, Sheshunoff Information Services, and Texas Instruments.

Between January 2007 and June 2008, two leases, together for 41,600 square feet (3,860 m^{2}) of space, took space in Las Cimas IV. Wilson Sonsini Goodrich & Rosati PC, a law firm, took 35,600 square feet (3,310 m^{2}), while U.S Risk Insurance Group took about 6,000 square feet (560 m^{2}). In early February 2009 Vitesse Semiconductor Corp. leased 14,375 square feet (1,335.5 m^{2}) in Las Cimas IV, the newest building in the Las Cimas complex. Intersil Corp. leased 15,821 square feet (1,469.8 m^{2}) of space in Las Cimas IV later that month. Over half of the space that was leased in the end of February 2009 had been taken in the six preceding months.

In 2010 St. Jude Medical Inc. occupied 60,000 square feet (5,600 m^{2}) in two buildings in Las Cimas. In the fourth quarter of 2010 American Campus Communities, Dell, Keller Williams, and St. Jude vacated about 160,000 square feet (15,000 m^{2}) of space within Las Cimas. Most of the vacation of space was due to a firm moving its offices to other locations in Greater Austin.

In 2025, a pickleball court was added to the top level of the Las Cimas IV parking garage.
