= EqualLogic =

American data storage company

EqualLogic, Inc.
- Type: Private
- Industry: Computer data storage
- Founded: 2001; 25 years ago
- Defunct: 2008
- Fate: Acquired by Dell
- Headquarters: Nashua, United States
- Products: iSCSI arrays
- Website: www.equallogic.com

EqualLogic, Inc. was an American computer data storage company based in Nashua, New Hampshire, active from 2001 to 2007. In 2008, the company was merged into Dell Inc. Dell-branded EqualLogic products are iSCSI-based storage area network (SAN) systems. Dell has 3 different lines of SAN products: EqualLogic, Compellent and Dell PowerVault.

== History ==
EqualLogic was a company based in Nashua, New Hampshire. Formed in 2001 by Peter Hayden, Paul Koning, and Paula Long, it raised $52 million from investors between 2001 and 2004. The company was considering an initial public offering on the Nasdaq stock-exchange, but accepted an offer from Dell in 2007, and was absorbed in late January 2008. The all-cash take-over transaction of $1.4 billion was the highest price paid for a company financed by venture investors at the time. At the time of acquisition, the company was backed by four venture capital investors: Charles River Ventures, TD Capital Ventures, Focus Ventures and Sigma Partners.

== Architecture ==
EqualLogic systems use iSCSI via either Gigabit Ethernet or 10 Gigabit Ethernet controllers. The now end of life (EOL) systems with 1 Gbit/s connections are the PS4100, PS6100 and PS6200 while the comparable systems with 10 Gbit/s Ethernet connections are PS4110, PS6110 and PS6210. There have been a number of previous generations, and as long as the software is updated on older systems they can work with the newer models. Within each series there are several options allowing for different types and sizes of hard disk drives or solid-state drives. EqualLogic options combine both in the same chassis and automatically migrate the most frequently accessed data to the SSDs. All PS series systems, except the PS-M4110 blade chassis system, are 19-inch rack systems in a 2 rack unit form factor or a 4 RU chassis for some of the PS61x0 models and the PS65x0 dense models.

EqualLogic Arrays can be combined with up to 16 arrays per group. Groups can mix different members, including multiple hardware generations, as well as different RAID types, in a group. By combining multiple arrays per group, very large storage groups can be created with maximum capacity in one group of over 1.5 PB. Arrays can be segmented into pools, and from pools, volumes. Volumes are exposed on a SAN network, and used by virtual machine hosts or other computers.

=== Controllers ===
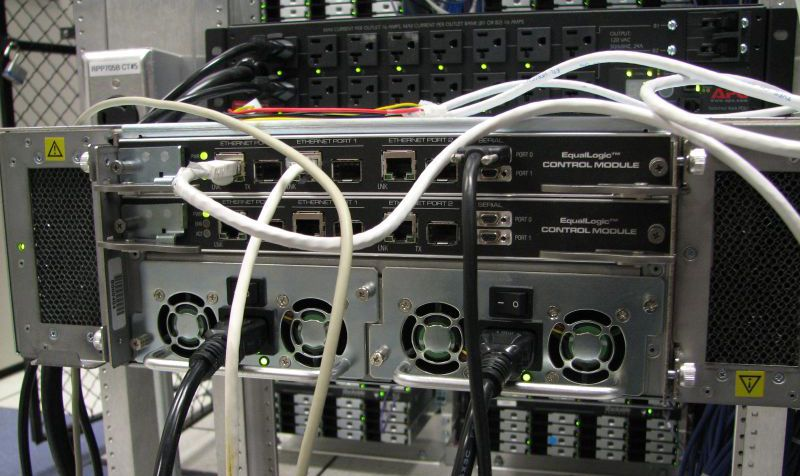
EqualLogic control modules on a PS100E

Each array comes with two controllers, offering redundancy and load-balancing. A controller offers one or more data Ethernet interfaces for the iSCSI traffic and one management interface. A typical array has 2 or more iSCSI Ethernet interfaces and one management interface. The arrays with model PS XX00 have Gigabit Ethernet ports while the PS XX10 offer 10 Gigabit Ethernet ports for iSCSI traffic and a 10 Mbit/s / 100 Mbit/s management port. Depending on the model the interfaces can be either copper-based Gigabit Ethernet or 10GBASE-T or fiber-optic interfaces using Small Form-factor Pluggable transceivers. Controllers can be readily identified by a combination of their "faceplate" profile and color.

Controller type	Profile	Color	Disk interface and speed	Network interface	Management	Associated models	Manufacturer's P/N	Dell P/N
Type 1 SATA	wide	black	SATA I at 1.5 Gbit/s	3 x 1000BASE-T / 1 Gbit/s SFP (combo)	1 (shared)	PS50E, PS100E, PS200E, PS300E, PS400E, PS100X	70-0001	
Type 2 SATA	wide	blue	SATA II at 3 Gbit/s	3 x 1000BASE-T / 1 Gbit/s SFP (combo)	1 (shared)	PS50E, PS100E, PS200E, PS300E, PS400E, PS100X	70-0011	T946J / 0T946J
Type 3 SAS	narrow	blue	SAS or SATA II at 3 Gbit/s	3 x 1 Gbit/s	1 (shared)	PS3000 – PS5000	70-0101	
Type 4 SAS	narrow	grey	SAS at 3 Gbit/s	3 x 1 Gbit/s	0	PS3000 – PS5000	70-0111c	
Type 5 SATA	narrow	olive	SATA II at 3 Gbit/s	3 x 1 Gbit/s	0	PS3000 – PS5000	70-0115	
Type 6 SATA	narrow	grey with brown stripe	SATA	3 x 1 Gbit/s	1 (shared)	PS5500 only	70-0111a	
Type 7 SAS	narrow	light green	SAS SATA SSD	4 x 1 Gbit/s	0	PS6000 – PS6500	70-0202	5PM3C, RNPR1
Type 8 SAS	narrow	magenta	SAS SATA	2 x 1 Gbit/s	1	PS4000 only	70-0120	
Type 9 SAS	narrow	yellow	SAS SATA	2 x 1 Gbit/s	1 x 10/100 Mbit/s	2nd generation PS4000	70-0210	
Type 10	narrow	orange	SAS SATA SSD	2 x 10 Gbit/s SFP+	1 x 10/100 Mbit/s	PS6010 – PS6510	70-0300	0G9J5
Type 11	Wide	light green	SAS NL-SAS SSD	4 x 1 Gbit/s	1	PS6100 Only	70-0400	7V250, HRT01
Type 12	Wide	magenta	SAS NL-SAS	2 x 1000BASE-T	1	PS4100 Only		NMJ7P
Type 13	M-Blade	silver	SAS NL-SAS	1 x 10 Gbit/s KR / KR Pass-Thru		PS-M4110		1KWXY, 01KWXY
Type 14	Wide	orange	SAS NL-SAS SSD	1 x 10GBASE-T / 1 x SFP+	1	PS6110 Only		61NCV
Type 15	Wide	dark grey	SAS NL-SAS SSD	2 x 10GbE SFP+ / 2 x 10GBASE-T	1 x 10/100 Mbit/s	PS6210		DCY2N, K7TXY
Type 17	Wide	yellow	SAS NL-SAS	1 x 10GBASE-T / 1 x SFP+	1	PS4110 Only		X3J14, P0GJH YN3KR,
Type 18	Wide	Marine Blue	SAS NL-SAS SSD	2 x 10GBASE-T / 2 x 10GbE SFP+	1 x 10/100 Mbit/s	PS6610		T43HT
Type 19	Wide	Red	SAS NL-SAS SSD	2 x 10GBASE-T / 2 x 10GbE SFP+	1 x 10/100 Mbit/s	PS4210		3KKYP

== Models ==
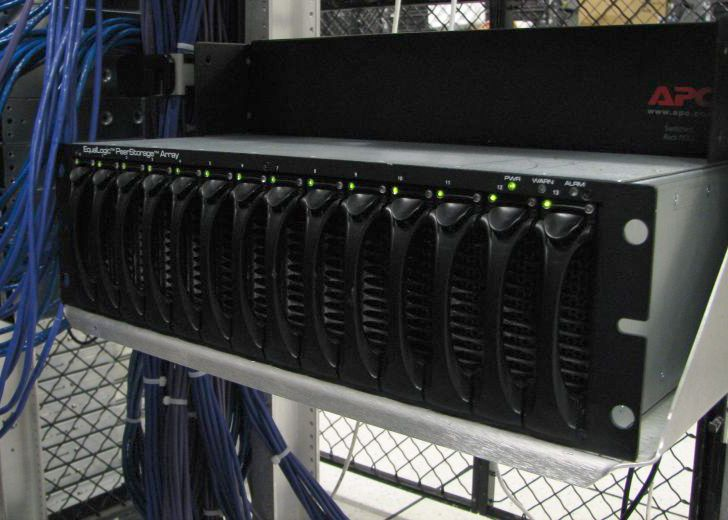
EqualLogic PS100E PeerStorage Array

The flagship product of the EqualLogic line is the PS Series (formerly PeerStorage). Its current primary models are the PS4100, PS6100 and PS6500 with 1 Gb Ethernet and 10 Gb Ethernet model options. Within each "series" (i.e. 4100, 6100 and 6500) there are several sub-models that include specific disk configurations. The last generation systems are the PS4100 and PS6100 series systems which continue to be sold.

=== PS41x0 ===
The PS4100 series consists of 4 rack-models and one PS-M4110 for placement in the Dell M1000e blade enclosure. This model is described separately below.

PS4000 rack models
Model	PS4100E	PS4100KV3,5	PS4110E	PS4110KV3,5
height (RU)	2 RU	2 RU	2 RU	2 RU
#HDD	12	12	12	12
HDD type	7200 NL-SAS	15K SAS	7200 NL-SAS	15K SAS
capacity min using	12 TB; 12 x 1 TB	3.6 TB; 6 x 600 GB	6 TB; 12 x 500 GB	3.6 TB; 6 x 600 GB
capacity max using	36 TB; 12 x 3 TB	7.2 TB; 12 x 600 GB	36 TB; 12 x 3 TB	7.2 TB; 12 x 600 GB
#controllers	2	2	2	2
memory/ctrl (Gb)	4	4	4	4
iSCSI ports per ctrl.	2 GbE	2 GbE	1 x 10GBaseT; 1 x 10 Gbit SFP+	1 x 10GBaseT; 1 x 10 Gbit SFP+
mgt ports per ctrl.	1 x 10/100Mbit	1 x 10/100Mbit	1 x 100 Mbit	1 x 100 Mbit
Max # volumes	256	256	256	256
Snapshots/volume	128	128	128	128
Snapshots/group	2048	2048	2048	2048
RAID levels	5,6,10,50	5,6,10,50	5,6,10,50	5,6,10,50
Max arrays/group	up to 2 x PS4xxx arrays/group			

=== PS61x0 ===
The PS61x0 series consists of two main models: PS6100 and PS6110 for 1G or 10G iSCSI Ethernet ports on the controller. All arrays support RAID levels 6,10 and 50.

For the PS6100 series and PS6110 series there are 6 sub-models, based on the type of disks used:

Model	PS61x0-E	PS61x0-X	PS61x0-XV	PS61x0-S	PS61x0-XS	PS61x0-XV3,5
usage/type	high-capacity	balanced	high-performance	low latency	automated SSD tiering	high performance& high capacity
height (RU)	4	2	2	2	2	4
weight	45,36	25,4	25,4	24,5	24,5	44,45
max # disks/size	24x 3,5"	24x 2.5"	24 x 2,5"	24 x 2,5"	7 x 2,5SSD; 17 z 10K SAS	24 x 3,5"
disk type	7200 NL-SAS	10K SAS	15K SAS	SSD	SSD/10K SAS	15K SAS
min capacity using	12 TB; 500 GB HDD	7,2 TB; 300 GB	3,5 TB; 146 GB	9,6 TB; 400 GB SSD	13 TB; 7 x 400 GB SSD; 17 x 600 GB HDD	7,2 TB; 12 x 600GB
max capacity using	72 TB; 3 TB HDD	21,6 TB; 900 GB	7,2 TB; 300 GB	19,2 TB; 800 GB SSD	13 TB fixed capacity	14,4 TB; 600 GB
Power consumption	1080 W	700 W	700 W	700 W	700 W	1080 W

=== PS-M 4110 ===
The PS-M 4110 is a SAN array in the form-factor of a dual 1/2 height blade-server and can be installed in the Dell M1000e blade-chassis. There are 4 models of this "datacenter in a box" solution where servers, storage and networking are all combined in one blade-enclosure

The SAN communicates with the blade servers in the chassis and/or external servers via Force10 MXL switches, PowerConnect M8024-K or Brocade based PC-M8428-K in the back of the enclosure. Also possible to use 10G Passthrough modules and external switches.

PS-M 4110 blade SAN
Model	PS-M4110-E	PS-M4110-X	PS-M4110-XV	PS-M4110-XS
Usage	Hi-capacity	balanced perf/capacity	high perf	low latency
Controllers	1 or 2	1 or 2	1 or 2	2 only
Typical power	248,9 W	261 W	293,3 W	230,4 W
Weight (Kg)	12,49	12,87	12,62	12,38
Disk drives	14 HDD	14 HDD	14 HDD	9 x 10K SAS & 5 x SSD
Drive capacity	500 GB or 1 TB	600 GB; 900 GB	146 GB; 300 GB	600 GB HDD; 400 GB SSD
Drive type	7,2k NL-SAS	10K SAS	15K SAS	10K SAS+SSD
System capacity	7 - 14 TB	8,4-12.5 Tbit	2,5-4,2 TB	7.4 Tbit

=== PS6500 and PS6510 ===
The PS65x0 series consists of in total 6 models scalable SAN solutions. As with the other series the PS6500 is using Gigabit Ethernet NICs and the PS6510 offers 10 Gbit/s SFP+ interfaces.

PS 65x0 SAN
Model	PS6500-E/P6510-E	PS6500-ES/PS6510-ES	PS6500-X/PS6510-X
Intended Usage	High density	High Performance	Mixed Use
Height (Rack Units)	4	4	4
Weight LB(Kg)	up to 165(74.8)	up to 165(74.8)	up to 165(74.8)
Power consumption	1000-1030 VA; 1400 VA Peak	1000-1030 VA; 1400 VA Peak	1000-1030 VA; 1400 VA Peak
Heat dispensation	3400 BTU max	3400 BTU	3400 BTU
Drive Bays	48	7 SSD + 41 HDD	48
Drive Options	1TB SATA; 2TB SATA; 3 TB NL-SAS	7 x 400 Gb SSD & 41 x 2 TB NL-SAS	600 GB-SAS; 900 GB SAS
Drive Speed	7200 RPM	SSD & 7200 RPM SAS	10K RPM
RAW Capacity	48 TB(1TB Drives); 96 TB(2TB Drives); 144 TB(3TB Drives)	84.8 TB	28.9 TB (600GB Drives; 43.2 TB (900GB Drives)

== FS7500 / FS7600 ==
Dell Fluid File System is available in combination with an EQLX array for the storage. FluidFS is also delivered in combination with Compellent and PowerVault SAN systems. Both the FS7500 and FS7600 NAS using EQLX SAN offers a maximum system site of 509 TB. The FS7600 is the 2nd generation system which is also available using 10G iSCSI speeds between the FS controller and the storage backbone
