= PowerVault =

Line of data storage and backup products

Dell PowerVault
- Developer: Dell Technologies (2016 - current); Dell (1998-2016)
- Type: Storage server
- Released: 1998; 28 years ago
- CPU: x86
- Related: Dell EMC Unity
- Website: PowerVault

PowerVault is a line of data storage and backup products from Dell Technologies.

After Dell acquired EqualLogic for its iSCSI products in 2008, and Compellent Technologies in 2011, the PowerVault line was positioned as less expensive than the other product lines.

== Direct Attached Storage ==
Released	Model	Rack units	Number of drives	Drive size	Transfer	Type	Controller
2009	MD1000	3U	15	3.5"	3 Gbit/s	SAS or SATA	PERC 5/e or 6/e
2009	MD1120	2U	24	2.5"	3 Gbit/s	SAS	PERC 6/e
2010	MD1200	2U	12	3.5"	6 Gbit/s	SAS	PERC H800
2010	MD1220	2U	24	2.5"	6 Gbit/s	SAS	PERC H800
2015	MD1280	5U	84	3.5"	6 Gbit/s	SAS	
2014	MD1400	2U	12	3.5"	12 Gbit/s	SAS	PERC9
2014	MD1420	2U	24	2.5"	12 Gbit/s	SAS	PERC9
2023	MD2412^{[29]}	2U	12	3.5"	24 Gbit/s	SAS	PERC H840/H965e
2023	MD2424^{[29]}	2U	24	2.5"	24 Gbit/s	SAS	PERC H840/H965e
2023	MD2460^{[29]}	4U	60	3.5"	24 Gbit/s	SAS	PERC H840/H965e
2009	MD3000	3U	15	3.5"	3 Gbit/s	SAS or SATA	PERC 5/e
2012	MD3060e	4U	60	3.5"	6 Gbit/s	SAS	
2010	MD3200	2U	12	3.5"	6 Gbit/s	SAS	
2010	MD3220	2U	24	2.5"	6 Gbit/s	SAS	
2010	MD3260	4U	60	3.5"	12 Gbit/s	SAS	
2014	MD3400	2U	12	3.5"	12 Gbit/s	SAS	
2014	MD3420	2U	24	2.5"	12 Gbit/s	SAS	
2014	MD3460	4U	60	3.5"	12 Gbit/s	SAS	
2019	ME4012	2U	12	3.5"	12 Gbit/s	SAS	
2019	ME4024	2U	24	2.5"	12 Gbit/s	SAS	
2019	ME4084	5U	84	3.5"	12 Gbit/s	SAS	
2022	ME5012	2U	12	3.5"	12 Gbit/s	SAS	
2022	ME5024	2U	24	2.5"	12 Gbit/s	SAS	
2022	ME5084	5U	84	3.5"	12 Gbit/s	SAS	
2025	ME5212	2U	12	3.5"	24 Gbit/s	SAS/SSD/NLSAS	
2025	ME5224	2U	24	2.5"	24 Gbit/s	SAS/SSD/NLSAS	
2025	ME5284	5U	84	3.5"	24 Gbit/s	SAS/SSD/NLSAS	

=== Older Equipment ===
- 200S - 1998
- 210S - Used SCSI
- 220S - Used SCSI

== Storage Area Network ==
Includes the PowerVault MD 3200i, 3220i, 3400, 3420, 3460 for 1 Gbit/s iSCSI, MD 3800I, 3820I, and 3860I for 10 Gbit/s iSCSI, and the MD 3800f, 3820f, and 3860f for Fibre Channel.

=== Older Equipment ===
- 630F
- 650F - 1998
- 660F

== Network Attached Storage ==
- 701N - 2001
- 705N
- 715N
- 725N - 2002
- 735N - 2001
- 745N - 2004
- 770N - 2002
- 775N - 2002

With Windows Storage Server 2012 R2 or 2016 operating system:

- NX400 / NX430 / NX440
- NX3200 / NX3230 / NX3240
- NX3300 / NX3330 / NX3340

== Tape Storage ==
=== DDS4 ===
- 100T DDS4
- 120T DDS4

=== DLT ===
- 110T DLT1
- 110T DLT7000

=== LTO ===
- 110T LTO-1
- 110T LTO-2
- 112T LTO-2
- 114T/114X
- 122T LTO
- 124T
- 128T LTO
- 130T
- 132T
- 136T LTO-2
- ML6000
- TL2000 - Uses the same chassis build as the IBM TS3100. Components, including drives in many cases, can be interchanged between the two models, including the TL4000.
- TL4000 - Uses the same chassis build as the IBM TS3200. Components, including drives in many cases, can be interchanged between the two models, including the TL2000.
