= Credant Technologies =

Former American data security company

- Type: Private, acquired by Dell
- Industry: Information Technology
- Founded: 2001
- Founder: Bob Heard; Chris Burchett; Andrew Kahl
- Defunct: 2012
- Headquarters: Addison, Texas
- Key people: Bob Heard: CEO; David Becker: CFO; Chris Burchett: CTO; Andrew Kahl: 'Sr.VP Operations
- Products: Mobile Guardian, Policy Proxy, Self-encrypting drives, Compliance Reporter, BitLocker manager
- Website: www.credant.com

Credant Technologies was a data security company located in Addison, Texas. The company was founded in 2001 by Bob Heard, Chris Burchett and Andrew Kahl.

Credant was acquired by Dell in December 2012.

== History ==
In December 2012, Dell agreed to acquire Credant for an undisclosed amount.

== Products ==
The company offered a range of products to protect data from "leaking". Several different versions of the main technology can be used on different locations in the network: via a "policy proxy" on the border between the LAN and the internet or in the DMZ, or a central "enterprise server" within the network. Also editions for Exchange servers and domain controllers are available. Other products are self-encrypting drivers that will encrypt all data on that drive without any additional requirements on the client or from the user, BitLocker management systems, Policy Reporting tools.
