= Dell IdeaStorm =

Dell IdeaStorm was a website launched by Dell in 2007 to allow Dell to receive feedback from customers. The project was described as both crowdsourcing and Web 2.0.

== History ==
Michael Dell decided to launch the site after hearing it suggested by a corporate blogger, and Michael Dell has always spoken positively about it. When launched in 2007, the site was intended to work as an online suggestion box, something that was innovative at the time. Dell employees monitored the site and collaborated with user to decide which suggestions should be incorporated into Dell products. However, most of the features implemented were suggested in the first two and a half years of the site's operation. As time passed, Dell gradually reduced the number of employees monitoring the site, so that by 2010, a single employee was monitoring a site with over a million users.

IdeaStorm was revamped and relaunched in 2011. The improvements to the site were largely based on criticism that Dell received from a regular Dell customer, who Dell invited to the IdeaStorm relaunch party. The relaunched site featured more Dell staff involvement, as well as involvement from Dell's suppliers. It also added a badges system for the site's regular contributors.

== Design ==
While initially created as an online suggestion box, the site grew more sophisticated as time went on. When using the site, customer's post their idea on how to improve Dell products. Users can the promote them, demote them, or add comments. At times, Dell would create a discussion topic for user's to submit comments on as well.

The advantage of IdeaStorm was that both Dell and customers would benefit from the new features that resulted. However, the main drawback is that this is often an inefficient way of producing product ideas. This is due to the large amount of low quality suggestions, that Dell must review. Another disadvantage is that such a site can devolve into little more than a complaints board, where customers vent about flaws with Dell's products. Another limitation is the bandwagon effect - people tend to support existing ideas rather than contribute their own. Preventing users from seeing other user's idea could potentially allow for more creativity. Finally, in crowdsourcing systems, companies tend to favor ideas that are the easiest to implement, and these are often the least innovative ideas.

Dell has implemented about 500 ideas that came from the IdeaStorm platform, out of over 23,000 submitted. However, Dell has not made clear how valuable those 500 ideas were. Such an expenditure, if it only contributed to minor improvements, is not worthwhile for a company.
