= Hasee =

Chinese computer manufacturer

Shenzhen Hasee Computer Co., Ltd

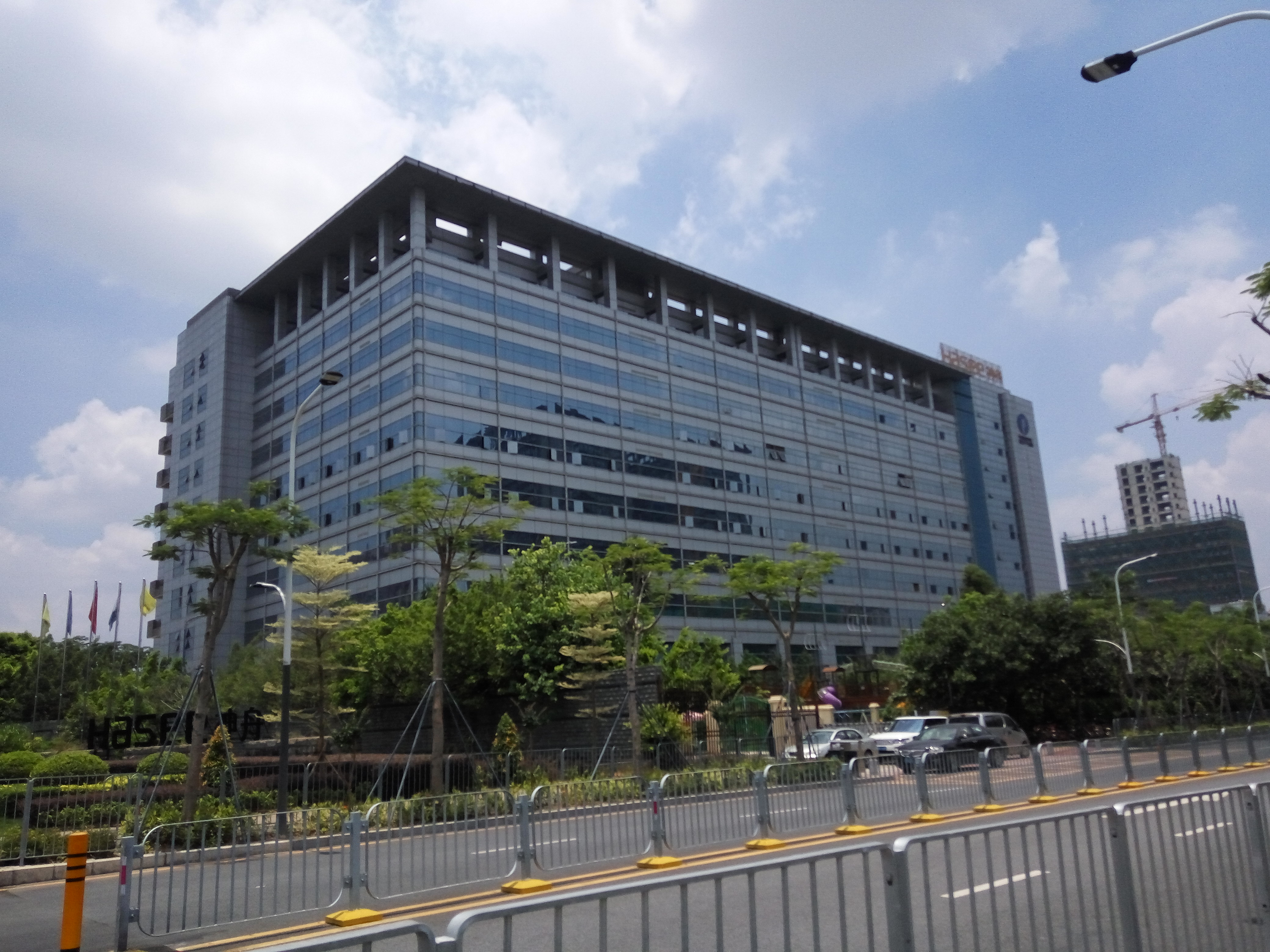
- Headquarters in Longgang, Shenzhen, China
- Native name: 深圳市神舟电脑股份有限公司
- Romanized name: Shēnzhèn Shì Shénzhōu Diànnǎo Gǔfèn Yǒuxiàn Gōngsī
- Type: Private
- Industry: Computer hardware Electronics
- Founded: 3 January 1995; 31 years ago (as Shenzhen New World Industrial Co., Ltd) 15 January 2001; 25 years ago (as Hasee 神舟电脑)
- Founder: Wu Haijun
- Headquarters: Shenzhen, Guangdong, China
- Area served: Worldwide
- Key people: Wu Haijun (Chairman and President); Jean Tafazzoli (CEO for European market)
- Products: Personal computers, cell phones
- Revenue: ▲CN¥46.24 billion (2010)
- Net income: ▲CN¥2.58 billion (2010)
- Parent: Hasee Group
- Website: en.haseecomputer.com

Shenzhen Hasee Computer Co., Ltd (Chinese: 神舟电脑; pinyin: Shénzhōu Diànnǎo) is a Chinese personal computer manufacturer headquartered in Shenzhen, Guangdong, China. In 2008, it was the second largest Chinese computer maker.

In addition to its domestic market, Hasee products are sold worldwide.

== History ==
Hasee was founded in 1995 as a PC company, initially creating graphics cards, eventually developing their own R&D labs by 2000.

In July 1997, Hasee introduced its own brand of motherboards Panying (磐英).

In January 2002, Hasee gained significant public attention with its "bring a Pentium 4 home with ¥4880" (四千八百八，奔四扛回家) advertisement campaign aired on CCTV, which quickly boosted its popularity. In May of that year, construction began on the New World Industrial Park. The following year, in February 2003, Hasee started producing laptops. That same year, Hasee's chairman, Wu Haijun, was ranked 18th on the Hurun "IT Rich List" with a net worth of 1 billion yuan. Around this time, the company also entered the South Korean market.

In November 2005, Hasee's Commercial OEM Division was officially established, and in May 2006, the company began planning its entry into the German market. By January 2007, Hasee expanded into the Middle Eastern market. In 2008, the company faced a setback when a defect in some of Nvidia's graphics chips led to the "Graphics Card Scandal." Despite this, Hasee continued to grow and entered the Japanese market in May 2009.

In July 2010, reports indicated that Hasee Computers was planning to list on the ChiNext board. On March 22, 2011, Hasee officially submitted its application for listing on ChiNext for review. However, the very next day, the application was rejected by the China Securities Regulatory Commission (CSRC). According to reports, this was Hasee's (and its parent company's) third unsuccessful attempt to go public.

On July 6, 2011, Hasee officially launched its tablet computer Lipad. On September 30 of the same year, Hasee submitted its fourth application for listing on the ChiNext board. On July 31, 2012, the China Securities Regulatory Commission (CSRC) announced that Hasee's request to list on the Shenzhen ChiNext board had been approved. However, the decision was met with significant public skepticism, with many questioning whether Hasee had "beautified" its financial statements in order to gain approval, as well as concerns over the company's long-term profitability.

In September 2012, media reports indicated that due to declining sales, Hasee had closed several subsidiaries and distributors, as well as two of its four factories. Additionally, some of the company's production land was reportedly being leased out for profit under the name of Hasee's parent company, New World Group, by Chairman Wu Haijun.

In May 2013, nearly a year after its request for ChiNext listing was approved, Hasee withdrew its listing application voluntarily, as it was unable to submit the required self-inspection report on time.

== Products ==
Hasee products include no frills systems sold at low prices. In 2003, some of its desktop models were referred to as "among the cheapest on the [Chinese] market," and in 2008, a Hasee laptop could be purchased for little more than US$370. Hasee considers some of its products "competitively priced".

Hasee's products include laptops, desktops, smartphones, tablets, and panel PCs. In the mid-2000s, Hasee manufactured its own motherboards, In 2010, the company stated that its motherboard manufacturing division continues.

== Operations ==
=== Subsidiaries ===
Hasee's subsidiaries include Shenzhen Hasee Computer Co Ltd, Shenzhen Paradise Science and Technology Co Ltd, Shenzhen Hass IC Co Ltd, Shenzhen Creative Science and Technology Co Ltd, Hasee Electronics Fty, and Shenzhen Paradise Advertisement Co Ltd.

=== Production bases and facilities ===
Facilities include 230,000 sq meters in Hasee Industrial Park located in Bantian, Shenzhen, and the total floor-space of all Hasee facilities was estimated to be 400,000 sq meters in 2004.

Production bases, as of 2004, included a site in Longgang District, Shenzhen.

== See also ==
- White box (computer hardware)
