= Dell =

American multinational technology company

Dell Inc.
- Logo as of September 7, 2016

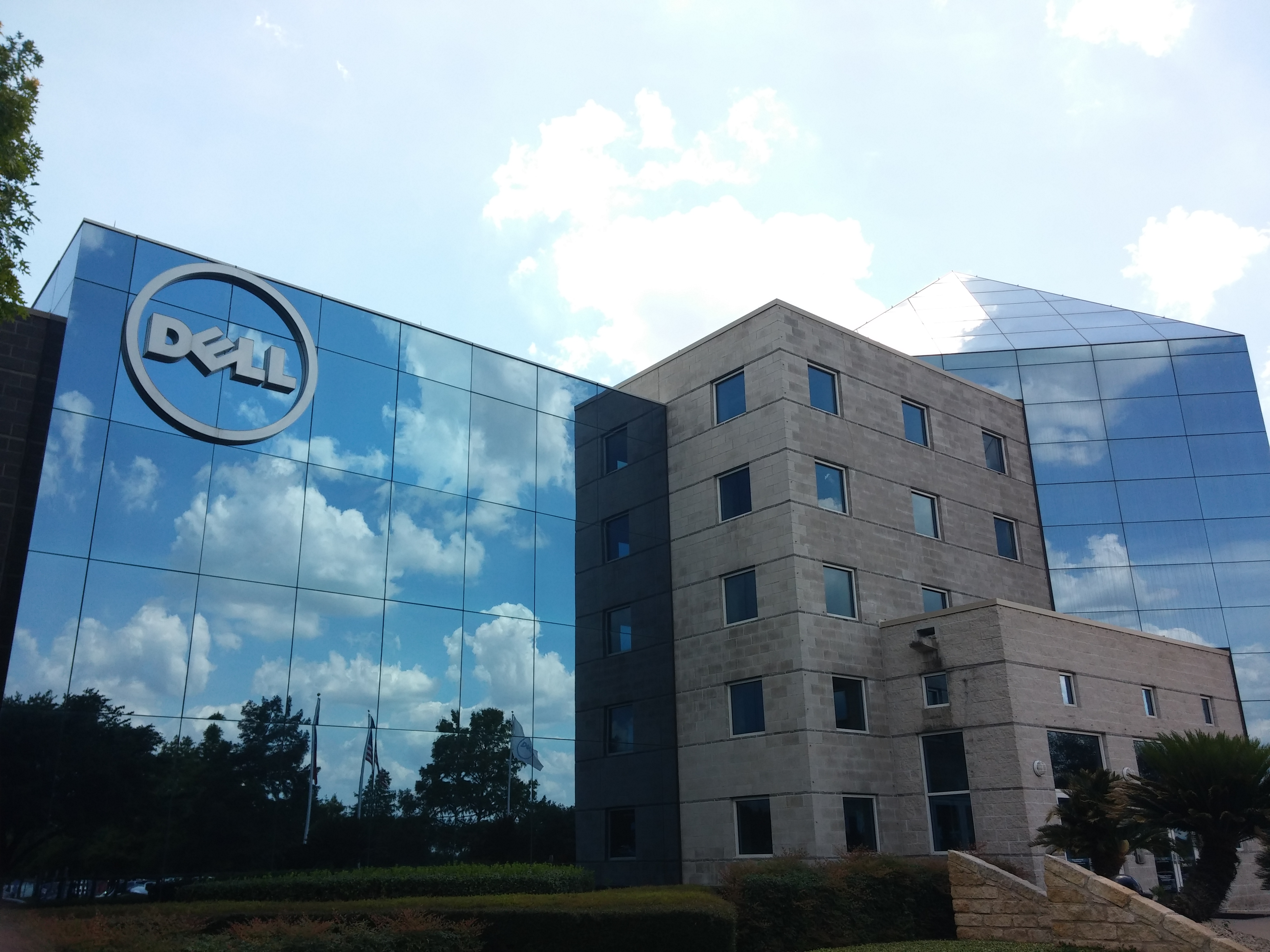
- Headquarters in Round Rock, Texas
- Formerly: PC's Limited (1984–1987); Dell Computer Corporation (1987–2003)
- Type: Subsidiary
- Traded as: Nasdaq: DELL (until 2013) NYSE: DELL (since 2018)
- Industry: Personal computers; Computer software
- Founded: May 3, 1984; 42 years ago in Austin, Texas, U.S.
- Founder: Michael Dell
- Headquarters: Round Rock, Texas, U.S.
- Area served: Worldwide
- Key people: Michael Dell (chairman & CEO); Jeff Clarke (vice chair & COO)
- Products: Personal computers; Servers; Peripheral
- Revenue: 54,142,000,000 United States dollar (2014)
- Operating income: −316,000,000 United States dollar (2014)
- Net income: −1,221,000,000 United States dollar (2014)
- Number of employees: 165,000 (2020)
- Parent: Dell Technologies (2016–present)
- Website: www.dell.com

Dell Inc., formerly Dell Computer Corporation, is an American technology company that develops, sells, repairs, and supports personal computers (PCs), servers, data storage devices, network switches, software, computer peripherals including printers and webcams among other products and services. Dell is based in Round Rock, Texas.

Founded by Michael Dell in 1984, Dell started making IBM clone computers and pioneered selling cut-price PCs directly to customers, managing its supply chain and electronic commerce. The company rose rapidly during the 1990s and in 2001 became the largest global PC vendor for the first time. Dell was a pure hardware vendor until 2009 when it acquired Perot Systems. It then entered the market for IT services. The company has expanded storage and networking systems. In the late 2000s, it began expanding from offering computers only to delivering a range of technology for enterprise customers.

Dell is a subsidiary of Dell Technologies, a publicly traded company, as well as a component of the NASDAQ-100 and S&P 500. The company is ranked 31st on the Fortune 500 list in 2022, up from 76th in 2021. It is also the sixth-largest company in Texas by total revenue, according to Fortune magazine. Dell is the second-largest non-oil company in Texas. As of 2025, it is the world's third-largest personal computer vendor by unit sales, after Lenovo and HP. In 2015, Dell acquired the enterprise technology firm EMC Corporation, together becoming divisions of Dell Technologies. Dell began marketing data storage, information security, virtualization, analytics, and cloud computing products under the brand Dell EMC until around 2020.

== History ==
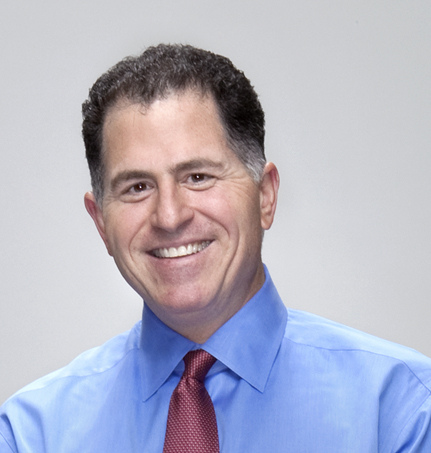
Michael Dell (founder)

Dell's first logo from May 3, 1987 to March 1, 1992

Dell's former logo, used from March 1, 1992 to November 23, 2010 as primary and from November 23, 2010 to September 7, 2016 as secondary

Dell's logo used before the acquisition of EMC, used from November 23, 2010 to September 7, 2016

=== Founding and start-up ===
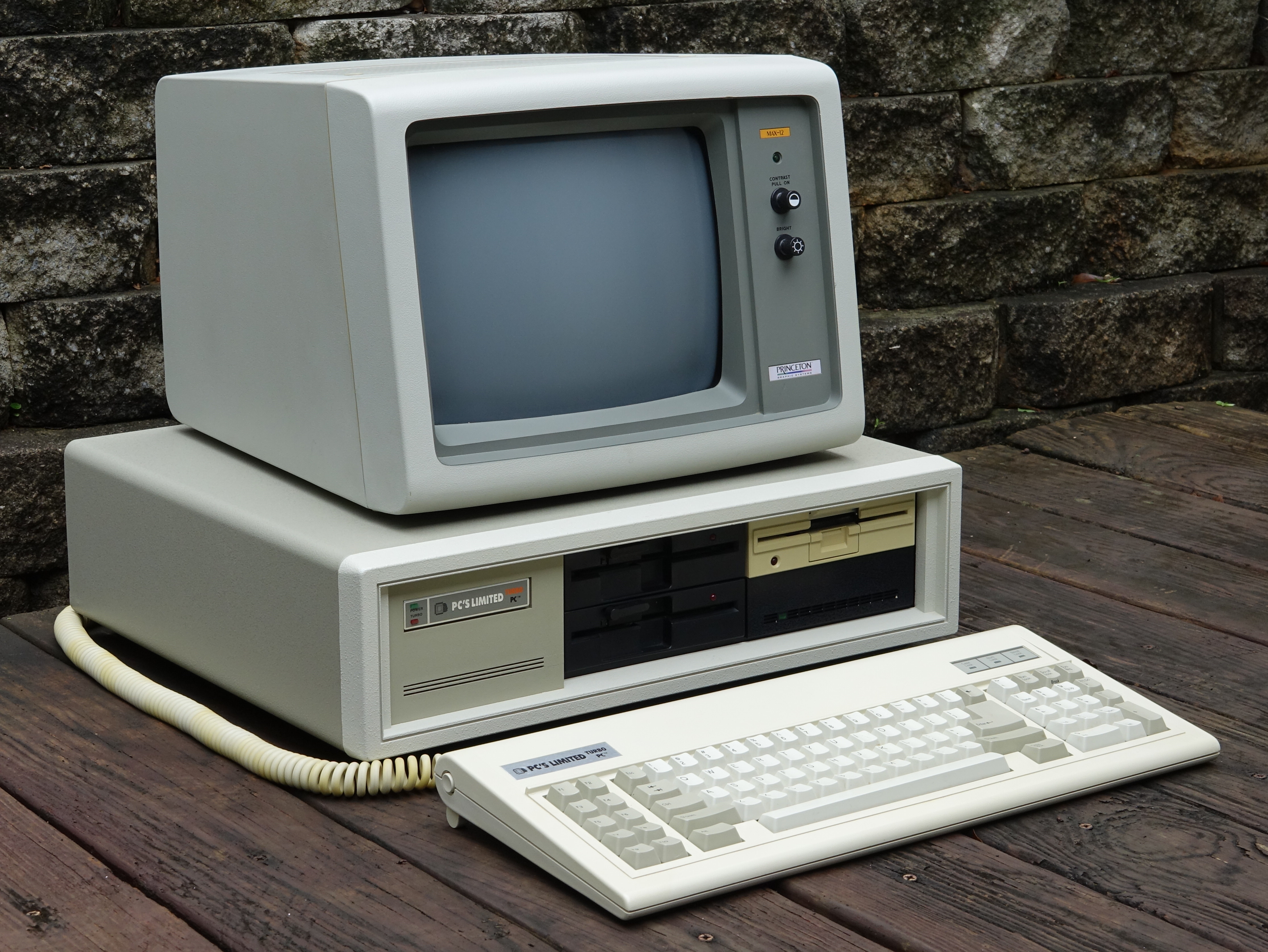
The Turbo PC

Michael Dell founded the company in 1984 as PC's Limited. At the time, Dell was a student at the University of Texas at Austin and operated the business from his off-campus dormitory room at the Dobie Center. The aim was to sell IBM PC compatible computers built from stock components. He believed that by selling personal computer systems directly to customers, their needs could be better understood, and thus his company could succeed by providing the most effective computing services. After getting about $1,000 in expansion-capital from his family, Dell dropped out of college upon completion of his freshman year in order to focus full-time on his fledgling business. As of April 2021, Dell's net worth was estimated to be over $50 billion.

In 1985 PC's Limited launched its first computer — the Turbo PC — priced at US$795 (equivalent to $2,018 in 2025). It featured an Intel 8088-compatible processor with a maximum speed of 8 MHz. At that time, PC's Limited was considered one of many white box vendors, though by 1986 Hughes Aircraft was evaluating its products for corporate use after an executive's positive experience with a personal purchase. Systems were marketed through national computer magazines, selling directly to consumers while custom-assembling each unit based on a range of options. This approach allowed offering competitive prices compared to retail brands, coupled with the convenience of pre-assembled units, making them one of the early success stories of this business model. The company grossed over $73 million in its first year of operation.

In 1987 the company was renamed Dell Computer Corporation and began expanding globally. The new name was intended to better reflected its presence in the business market, and also resolved issues with the use of the word "Limited" in a company name in the United Kingdom. The company set up its first international operations in Britain, and eleven more followed within the next four years. On June 22, 1988, the company went public on NASDAQ under the ticker symbol DELL. Their IPO of $8.50 a share raised $30 million, leaving the company valued at $85 million (equivalent to $199.3 million in 2025). In 1989, the company launched its first laptop product, the Dell 316LT.

=== Growth in the 1990s and early 2000s ===
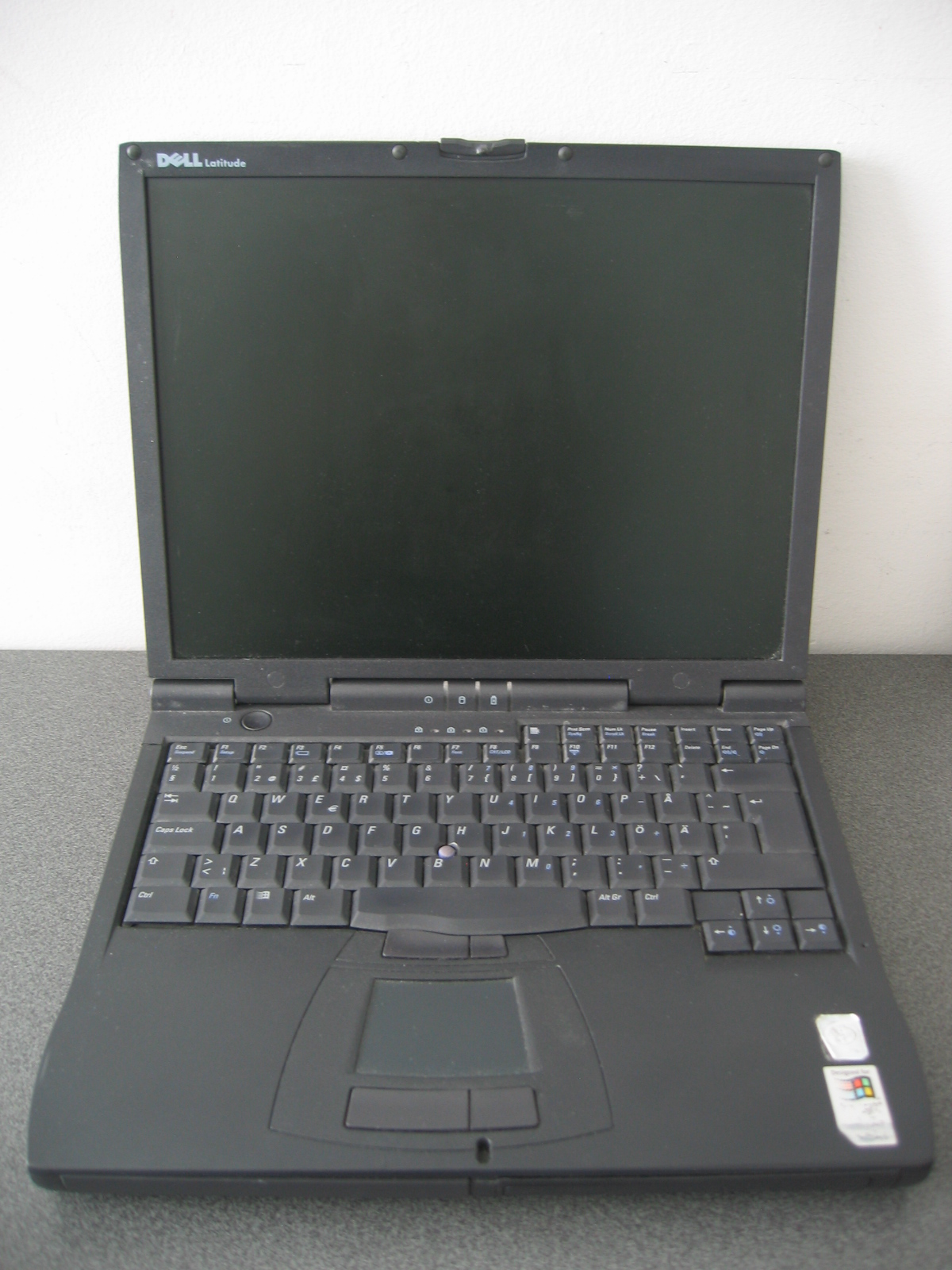
Dell Latitude CPx laptop

In 1990, Dell Computer tried selling its products indirectly through warehouse clubs and computer superstores, but met with little success, and the company re-focused on its more successful direct-to-consumer sales model. In 1992, Fortune included Dell Computer Corporation in its list of the world's 500 largest companies, making Michael Dell the youngest CEO of a Fortune 500 company at that time.

Senior vice president Joel Kocher told The Wall Street Journal in 1993 "this isn't a technology business anymore". His view, that PCs were commodities, was reportedly widely held by others in the company. They thought that Dell differentiated itself from others—like fellow Texas company and archrival Compaq—with its distribution expertise and "database engine" of customers that, Kocher said, could sell anything including non-technology products: "We're more like Mary Kay Cosmetics than we are like General Motors".

In 1993, to complement its own direct sales channel, Dell planned to sell PCs at big-box retail outlets such as Wal-Mart, which would have brought in an additional $125 million (equivalent to $251,200,000 in 2025) in annual revenue. Bain consultant Kevin Rollins persuaded Michael Dell to pull out of these deals, believing they would be money losers in the long run. Margins at retail were thin at best and Dell left the reseller channel in 1994. Rollins would soon join Dell full-time and eventually become the company president and CEO.

By the early 1990s the laptop computer market was both more profitable and faster-growing than the overall personal computer market. After discontinuing its unsuccessful existing products in 1993, and hiring John Medica—who had led development of the very successful Apple PowerBook—the company in 1994 introduced the Dell Latitude laptop line.

Originally, Dell did not emphasize the consumer market, due to the higher costs and low profit margins in selling to individuals and households; this changed when the company's Internet site took off in 1996 and 1997. While the industry's average selling price to individuals was going down, Dell's was going up, as second- and third-time computer buyers who wanted powerful computers with multiple features and did not need much technical support were choosing Dell. Dell found an opportunity among PC-savvy individuals who liked the convenience of buying direct, customizing their PC to their means, and having it delivered in days. In early 1997, Dell created an internal sales and marketing group dedicated to serving the home market and introduced a product line designed especially for individual users.

Dell's growth in the 1990s
Year	Revenue (mill. US$)	No. of employees
1990	546	2,050
1991	889	2,970
1992	2,013	4,650
1993	2,873	5,980
1994	3,475	6,400
1995	5,296	8,400
1996	7,759	10,350
1997	12,327	16,000
1998	18,243	24,400
1999	25,256	36,500

From 1997 to 2004, Dell steadily grew and it gained market share from competitors even during industry slumps, with its fastest growth occurring in the early 2000s. During the same period, rival PC vendors such as Compaq, Gateway, IBM, Packard Bell, and AST Research struggled and eventually left the market or were bought out. Dell surpassed Compaq to become the largest PC manufacturer in 1999. Operating costs made up only 10 percent of Dell's $35 billion in revenue in 2002 (equivalent to $5.979×10^{10} in 2025), compared with 21 percent of revenue at Hewlett-Packard, 25 percent at Gateway, and 46 percent at Cisco. In 2002, when Compaq merged with Hewlett-Packard (the fourth-place PC maker), the newly combined Hewlett-Packard took the top spot for a time but struggled and Dell soon regained its lead.

In 2002, Dell expanded its product line to include televisions, handhelds, digital audio players, and printers. Chairman and CEO Michael Dell had repeatedly blocked President and COO Kevin Rollins's attempt to lessen the company's heavy dependency on PCs, which Rollins wanted to fix by acquiring EMC Corporation; a move that would eventually occur over 12 years later.

In 2003, at the annual company meeting, the stockholders approved changing the company name to "Dell Inc." to recognize the company's expansion beyond computers.

In 2004, the company announced that it would build a new assembly-plant near Winston-Salem, North Carolina; the city and county provided Dell with $37.2 million in incentive packages; the state provided approximately $250 million (equivalent to $407,800,000 in 2025) in incentives and tax breaks. In July, Michael Dell stepped aside as chief executive officer while retaining his position as chairman of the board. Kevin Rollins, who had held a number of executive posts at Dell, became the new CEO. Despite no longer holding the CEO title, Dell essentially acted as a de facto co-CEO with Rollins.

Under Rollins, Dell purchased the computer hardware manufacturer Alienware in 2006. Dell Inc.'s plan anticipated Alienware continuing to operate independently under its existing management. Alienware expected to benefit from Dell's efficient manufacturing system.

=== Struggles in mid-2000s ===
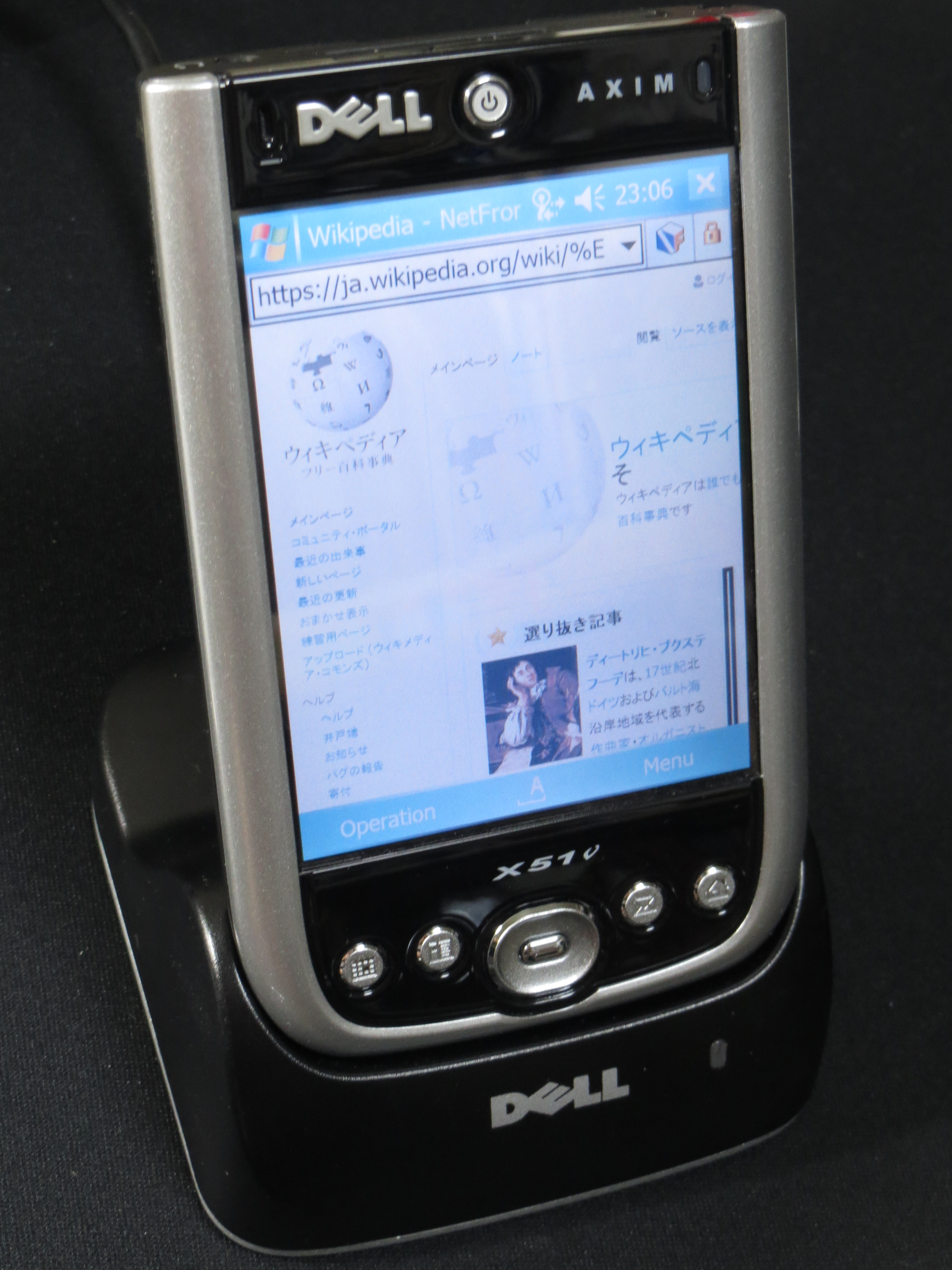
Dell Axim X51v, shown with the Japanese Wikipedia main page open

In 2005, while earnings and sales continued to rise, sales growth slowed considerably, and the company stock lost 25% of its value that year. By June 2006, the stock traded around US$25 which was 40% down from July 2005—the high-water mark of the company in the post-dotcom era.

The slowing sales growth has been attributed to the maturing PC market, which constituted 66% of Dell's sales, and analysts suggested that Dell needed to make inroads into non-PC business segments such as storage, services, and servers. Dell's price advantage was tied to its ultra-lean manufacturing for desktop PCs, but this became less important as savings became harder to find inside the company's supply chain, and as competitors such as Hewlett-Packard and Acer made their PC manufacturing operations more efficient to match Dell, weakening Dell's traditional price differentiation. Throughout the entire PC industry, declines in prices along with commensurate increases in performance meant that Dell had fewer opportunities to upsell to their customers. As a result, the company was selling a greater proportion of inexpensive PCs than before, which eroded profit margins. The laptop segment had become the fastest-growing of the PC market, but Dell produced low-cost notebooks in China like other PC manufacturers which eliminated Dell's manufacturing cost advantages, plus Dell's reliance on Internet sales meant that it missed out on growing notebook sales in big box stores. CNET has suggested that Dell was getting trapped in the increasing commoditization of high volume low margin computers, which prevented it from offering more exciting devices that consumers demanded.

Despite plans of expanding into other global regions and product segments, Dell was heavily dependent on US corporate PC market, as desktop PCs sold to both commercial and corporate customers accounted for 32 percent of its revenue, 85 percent of its revenue comes from businesses, and 64 percent of its revenue comes from North and South America, according to its 2006 third-quarter results. US shipments of desktop PCs were shrinking, and the corporate PC market, which purchases PCs in upgrade cycles, had largely decided to take a break from buying new systems. The last cycle started around 2002, three or so years after companies started buying PCs ahead of the perceived Y2K problems, and corporate clients were not expected to upgrade again until extensive testing of Microsoft's Windows Vista (expected in early 2007), putting the next upgrade cycle around 2008. Heavily dependent on PCs, Dell had to slash prices to boost sales volumes, while demanding deep cuts from suppliers.

Dell had long stuck by its direct sales model. Consumers had become the main drivers of PC sales in recent years, yet there had a decline in consumers purchasing PCs through the Web or on the phone, as increasing numbers were visiting consumer electronics retail stores to try out the devices first. Dell's rivals in the PC industry, HP, Gateway and Acer, had a long retail presence and so were well poised to take advantage of the consumer shift. The lack of a retail presence stymied Dell's attempts to offer consumer electronics such as flat-panel TVs and MP3 players. Dell responded by experimenting with mall kiosks, plus quasi-retail stores in Texas and New York.

Dell had a reputation as a company that relied upon supply chain efficiencies to sell established technologies at low prices, instead of being an innovator. By the mid-2000s many analysts were looking to innovating companies as the next source of growth in the technology sector. Dell's low spending on R&D relative to its revenue (compared to IBM, Hewlett-Packard, and Apple Inc.)—which worked well in the commoditized PC market—prevented it from making inroads into more lucrative segments, such as MP3 players and later mobile devices. Increasing spending on R&D would have cut into the operating margins that the company emphasized. Dell had done well with a horizontal organization that focused on PCs when the computing industry moved to horizontal mix-and-match layers in the 1980s, but by the mid-2000 the industry shifted to vertically integrated stacks to deliver an end-to-end IT product, and Dell lagged far behind competitors like Hewlett-Packard and Oracle.

In 2006, Dell rolled out DellConnect to answer customer inquiries more quickly. In July 2006, the company started its Direct2Dell blog, and then in February 2007, Michael Dell launched IdeaStorm.com, asking customers for advice including selling Linux computers and reducing the promotional "bloatware" on PCs. These initiatives did manage to cut the negative blog posts from 49% to 22%, as well as reduce the "Dell Hell" prominent on Internet search engines.

There was also criticism that Dell used faulty components for its PCs, particularly the 11.8 million OptiPlex desktop computers sold to businesses and governments from May 2003 to July 2005 that suffered from faulty capacitors. A battery recall in August 2006, as a result of a Dell laptop catching fire, caused much negative attention for the company though later, Sony was found responsible for the manufacturing of the batteries, however a Sony spokesman said the problem concerned the combination of the battery with a charger, which was specific to Dell.

2006 marked the first year that Dell's growth was slower than the PC industry as a whole. By the fourth quarter of 2006, Dell lost its title of the largest PC manufacturer to Hewlett Packard whose Personal Systems Group was invigorated thanks to a restructuring initiated by their CEO Mark Hurd.

==== SEC investigation ====
In August 2005, Dell became the subject of an informal investigation by the United States SEC. In 2006, the company disclosed that the US Attorney for the Southern District of New York had subpoenaed documents related to the company's financial reporting dating back to 2002. The company delayed filing financial reports for the third and fourth fiscal quarter of 2006, and several class-action lawsuits were filed. Dell Inc's failure to file its quarterly earnings report could have subjected the company to de-listing from the Nasdaq, but the exchange granted Dell a waiver, allowing the stock to trade normally. In August 2007, the company announced that it would restate its earnings for fiscal years 2003 through 2006 and the first quarter of 2007 after an internal audit found that certain employees had changed corporate account balances to meet quarterly financial targets. In July 2010, the SEC announced charges against several senior Dell executives, including Dell Chairman and CEO Michael Dell, former CEO Kevin Rollins, and former CFO James Schneider, "with failing to disclose material information to investors and using fraudulent accounting to make it falsely appear that the company was consistently meeting Wall Street earnings targets and reducing its operating expenses." Dell, inc. was fined $100 million, with Michael Dell personally fined $4 million.

=== Dell 2.0 and downsizing ===
After four out of five quarterly earnings reports were below expectations, Rollins resigned as president and CEO on January 31, 2007, and founder Michael Dell assumed the role of CEO again.

On March 1, 2007, the company issued a preliminary quarterly earnings report showing gross sales of $14.4 billion, down 5% year-over-year, and net income of $687 million (30 cents per share), down 33%. Net earnings would have declined even more if not for the effects of eliminated employee bonuses, which accounted for six cents per share. NASDAQ extended the company's deadline for filing financials to May 4.

Dell announced a change campaign called "Dell 2.0," reducing the number of employees and diversifying the company's products. While chairman of the board after relinquishing his CEO position, Michael Dell still had significant input in the company during Rollins' years as CEO. With the return of Michael Dell as CEO, the company saw changes in operations, the exodus of many senior vice-presidents and new personnel brought in from outside the company. Michael Dell announced a number of initiatives and plans (part of the "Dell 2.0" initiative) to improve the company's financial performance. These include elimination of 2006 bonuses for employees with some discretionary awards, reduction in the number of managers reporting directly to Michael Dell from 20 to 12, and reduction of "bureaucracy". Jim Schneider retired as CFO and was replaced by Donald Carty, as the company came under an SEC probe for its accounting practices.

On April 23, 2008, Dell announced the closure of one of its biggest Canadian call-centers in Kanata, Ontario, terminating approximately 1100 employees, with 500 of those redundancies effective on the spot, and with the official closure of the center scheduled for the summer. The call-center had opened in 2006 after the city of Ottawa won a bid to host it. Less than a year later, Dell planned to double its workforce to nearly 3,000 workers add a new building. These plans were reversed, due to a high Canadian dollar that made the Ottawa staff relatively expensive, and also as part of Dell's turnaround, which involved moving these call-center jobs offshore to cut costs. The company had also announced the shutdown of its Edmonton, Alberta, office, losing 900 jobs. In total, Dell announced the ending of about 8,800 jobs in 2007–2008 — 10% of its workforce.

By the late 2000s, Dell's "configure to order" approach of manufacturing—delivering individual PCs configured to customer specifications from its US facilities was no longer as efficient or competitive with high-volume Asian contract manufacturers as PCs became powerful low-cost commodities. Dell closed plants that produced desktop computers for the North American market, including the Mort Topfer Manufacturing Center in Austin, Texas (original location) and Lebanon, Tennessee (opened in 1999) in 2008 and early 2009, respectively. The desktop production plant in Winston-Salem, North Carolina, received US$280 million in incentives from the state and opened in 2005 (equivalent to $442,900,000 in 2025), but ceased operations in November 2010. Dell's contract with the state required them to repay the incentives for failing to meet the conditions, and they sold the North Carolina plant to Herbalife. Much work was transferred to manufacturers in Asia and Mexico, or some of Dell's own factories overseas. On January 8, 2009, Dell announced the closure of its manufacturing plant in Limerick, Ireland, with the loss of 1,900 jobs and the transfer of production to its plant in Łodź in Poland.

=== Attempts at diversification ===
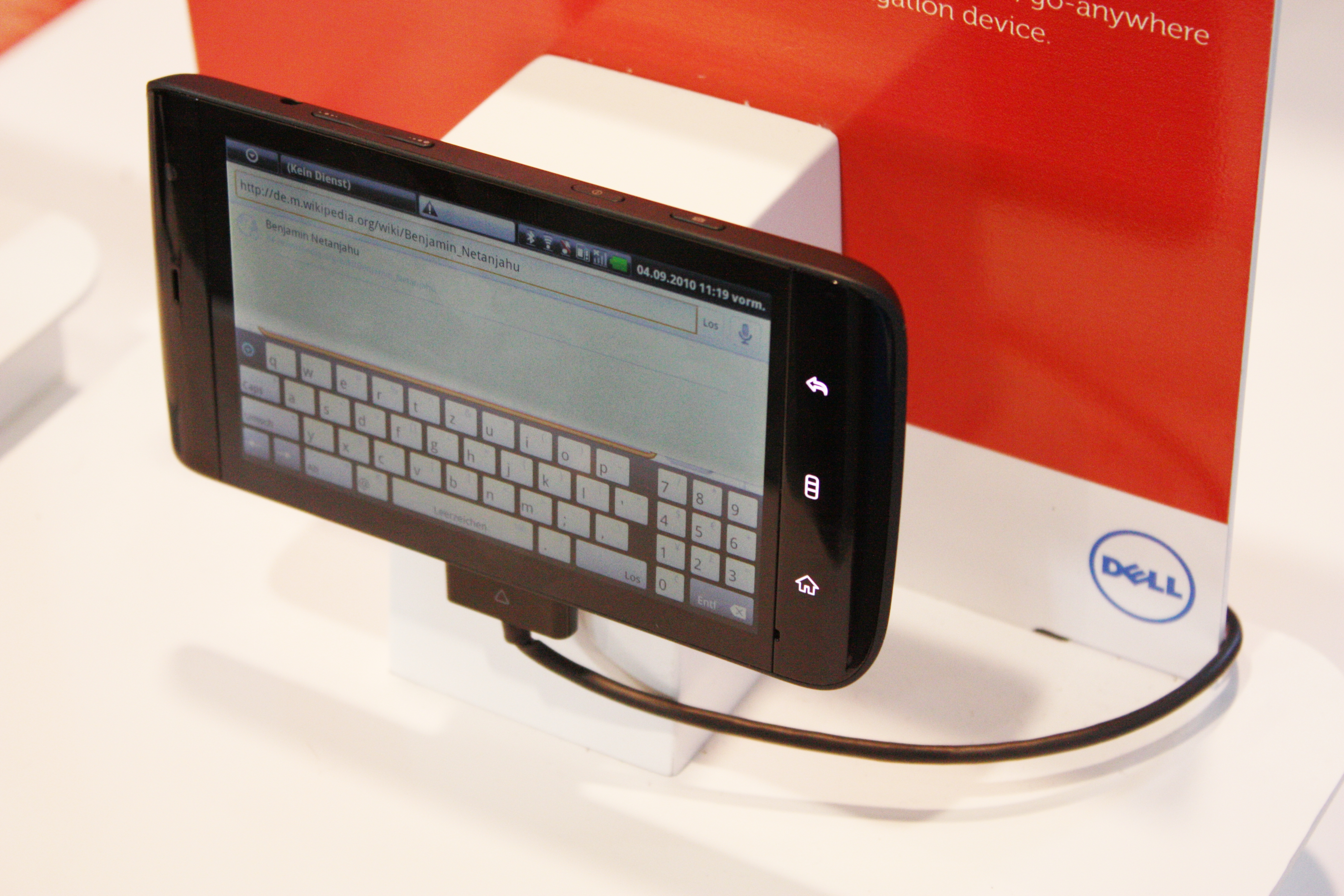
Dell Streak smartphone

The release of Apple's iPad tablet computer had a negative impact on Dell and other major PC vendors, as consumers switched away from desktop and laptop PCs. Dell's own mobility division has not managed success with developing smartphones or tablets, whether running Windows or Android. The Dell Streak was a failure commercially and critically due to its outdated OS, numerous bugs, and low resolution screen. InfoWorld suggested that Dell and other OEMs saw tablets as a short-term, low-investment opportunity running Google Android, an approach that neglected user interface and failed to gain long term market traction with consumers. Dell has responded by pushing higher-end PCs, such as the XPS line of notebooks, which do not compete with the Apple iPad and Kindle Fire tablets. The growing popularity of smartphones and tablet computers instead of PCs drove Dell's consumer segment to an operating loss in Q3 2012. In December 2012, Dell suffered its first decline in holiday sales in five years, despite the introduction of Windows 8.

In the shrinking PC industry, Dell continued to lose market share, as it dropped below Lenovo in 2011 to fall to number three in the world. Dell and fellow American contemporary Hewlett Packard came under pressure from Asian PC manufacturers Lenovo, Asus, and Acer, all of which had lower production costs and were willing to accept lower profit margins. In addition, while the Asian PC vendors had been improving their quality and design—for instance, Lenovo's ThinkPad series was winning corporate customers away from Dell's laptops—Dell's customer service and reputation had been slipping. Dell remained the second-most profitable PC vendor, as it took 13 percent of operating profits in the PC industry during Q4 2012, behind Apple's Mac that took 45 percent, seven percent at Hewlett Packard, six percent at Lenovo and Asus, and one percent for Acer.

Dell attempted to offset its declining PC business, which still accounted for half of its revenue and generates steady cash flow, by expanding into the enterprise market with servers, networking, software, and services. It avoided many of the acquisition write-downs and management turnover that plagued its chief rival Hewlett Packard. Despite spending $13 billion on acquisitions to diversify its portfolio beyond hardware, the company was unable to convince the market that it could thrive or made the transformation in the post-PC world, as it suffered continued declines in revenue and share price. Dell's market share in the corporate segment was previously a "moat" against rivals but this has no longer been the case as sales and profits have fallen precipitously.

=== 2013 privatization ===
After several weeks of rumors, which started around January 11, 2013, Dell announced on February 5, 2013, that it had struck a $24.4 billion (equivalent to $3.321×10^{10} in 2025) leveraged buyout deal, that would have delisted its shares from the NASDAQ and Hong Kong Stock Exchange and taken it private. Reuters reported that Michael Dell and Silver Lake Partners, aided by a $2 billion loan from Microsoft, would acquire the public shares at $13.65 apiece. The $24.4 billion buyout was projected to be the largest leveraged buyout backed by private equity since the 2008 financial crisis (equivalent to $3.645×10^{10} in 2025). It is also the largest technology buyout ever, surpassing the 2006 buyout of Freescale Semiconductor for $17.5 billion (equivalent to $2.685×10^{10} in 2025).

Michael Dell said of the February offer "I believe this transaction will open an exciting new chapter for Dell, our customers and team members". Dell rival Lenovo responded to the buyout, saying, "the financial actions of some of our traditional competitors will not substantially change our outlook."

In March 2013, the Blackstone Group and Carl Icahn expressed interest in purchasing Dell. In April 2013, Blackstone withdrew their offer, citing deteriorating business. Other private equity firms such as KKR & Co. and TPG Capital declined to submit alternative bids for Dell, citing the uncertain market for personal computers and competitive pressures, so the "wide-open bidding war" never materialized. Analysts said that the biggest challenge facing Silver Lake would be to find an "exit strategy" to profit from its investment, which would be when the company would hold an IPO to go public again, and one warned "But even if you can get a $25bn enterprise value for Dell, it will take years to get out."

In May 2013, Michael Dell joined his board in voting for the offer. The following August he reached a deal with the special committee on the board for $13.88 per share, a raised price of $13.75 plus a special dividend of 13 cents, as well as a change to the voting rules. The $13.88 cash offer (plus a $.08 per share dividend for the third fiscal quarter) was accepted on September 12 and closed on October 30, 2013, ending Dell's 25-year run as a publicly traded company.

After the buyout, the newly private Dell offered a Voluntary Separation Program that they expected to reduce their workforce by up to seven percent. The reception to the program so exceeded the expectations that Dell may be forced to hire new staff to make up for the losses.

=== Birth of Dell Technologies Inc. ===
On October 12, 2015, Dell Inc. announced its intent to acquire EMC Corporation. On September 7, 2016, the merger was completed. Resulting from the merger, a new parent company was formed — Dell Technologies Inc.

=== Brand restructuring ===
In 2025 a major shake up of branding occurred, affecting mainstream products including desktops, laptops, workstations, and monitors. Significant further refinement took place in a further restructuring in 2026. These events saw decades-old brand names discarded in favour of branding around the Dell name.

=== Dell and AMD ===
When Dell acquired Alienware early in 2006, some Alienware systems had AMD chips. On August 17, 2006, a Dell press release stated that starting in September, Dell Dimension desktop computers would have AMD processors and that later in the year Dell would release a two-socket, quad-processor server using AMD Opteron chips, moving away from Dell's tradition of only offering Intel processors in Dell PCs.

CNET's News.com on August 17, 2006, cited Dell's CEO Kevin Rollins as attributing the move to AMD processors to lower costs and to AMD technology. AMD's senior VP in commercial business, Marty Seyer, stated: "Dell's wider embrace of AMD processor-based offerings is a win for Dell, for the industry and most importantly for Dell customers."

On October 23, 2006, Dell announced new AMD-based servers—the PowerEdge 6950 and the PowerEdge SC1435.

On November 1, 2006, Dell's website began offering notebooks based on AMD processors (the Inspiron 1501 with a 15.4-inch (390 mm) display) with the choice of a single-core MK-36 processor, dual-core Turion X2 chips or Mobile Sempron.

In 2017, Dell released the AlienWare 17 gaming laptop. The model was primarily based on NVIDIA GeForce GTX 1080 systems.

=== Dell and desktop Linux ===
In 1998, Ralph Nader asked Dell (and five other major OEMs) to offer alternate operating systems to Microsoft Windows, specifically including Linux, for which "there is clearly a growing interest". Possibly coincidentally, Dell started offering Linux notebook systems that "cost no more than their Windows 98 counterparts" in 2000, and soon expanded, with Dell becoming "the first major manufacturer to offer Linux across its full product line". However, by early 2001 Dell had "disbanded its Linux business unit."

On February 26, 2007, Dell announced that it had commenced a program to sell and distribute a range of computers with pre-installed Linux distributions as an alternative to Microsoft Windows. Dell indicated that Novell's SUSE Linux would appear first. However, the next day, Dell announced that its previous announcement related to certifying the hardware as ready to work with Novell SUSE Linux and that it (Dell) had no plans to sell systems pre-installed with Linux in the near future. On March 28, 2007, Dell announced that it would begin shipping some desktops and laptops with Linux pre-installed, although it did not specify which distribution of Linux or which hardware would lead. On April 18, a report appeared suggesting that Michael Dell used Ubuntu on one of his home systems. On May 1, 2007, Dell announced it would ship the Ubuntu Linux distribution. On May 24, 2007, Dell started selling models with Ubuntu Linux 7.04 pre-installed: a laptop, a budget computer, and a high-end PC.

On June 27, 2007, Dell announced on its Direct2Dell blog that it planned to offer more pre-loaded systems (the new Dell Inspiron desktops and laptops). After the IdeaStorm site supported extending the bundles beyond the US market, Dell later announced more international marketing. On August 7, 2007, Dell officially announced that it would offer one notebook and one desktop in the UK, France and Germany with Ubuntu "pre-installed". At LinuxWorld 2007 Dell announced plans to provide Novell's SUSE Linux Enterprise Desktop on selected models in China, "factory-installed". On November 30, 2007, Dell reported shipping 40,000 Ubuntu PCs. On January 24, 2008, Dell in Germany, Spain, France, and the United Kingdom launched a second laptop, an XPS M1330 with Ubuntu 7.10, for 849 euro or GBP 599 upwards. On February 18, 2008, Dell announced that the Inspiron 1525 would have Ubuntu as an optional operating system. On February 22, 2008, Dell announced plans to sell Ubuntu in Canada and in Latin America. From September 16, 2008, Dell has shipped both Dell Ubuntu Netbook Remix and Windows XP Home versions of the Inspiron Mini 9 and the Inspiron Mini 12. As of November 2009 Dell shipped the Inspiron Mini laptops with Ubuntu version 8.04.

As of 2021, Dell continues to offer select laptops and workstations with Ubuntu Linux pre-installed, under the "Developer Edition" moniker.

== Certifications ==
Legacy Certifications

• Dell DCSE (Dell Certified Systems Expert) -Retired

Dell Proven Professional

The Dell Proven Professional Training & Certification Program offers two kinds of exams.

Achievement Exams are non-proctored, web-based exams that show competency in Dell's ecosystem including Client Systems, Networking or Servers. The downloadable paper achievement does not expire.

Certification Exams are proctored exams taken via Pearson VUE. They cost more than Achievement Exams and the downloadable paper certification may expire.

Achievement Exams

• Client Systems Support & Troubleshooting (Dell currently does not offer Certification Exams for Computer Repair).

Client Systems Deployment & Implementation (Dell currently does not offer Certification Exams for Computer Deployment & Implementation).

• PowerEdge Foundations

• GenAI Foundations

Certification Exams:

• Dell Networking Foundations

• Dell PowerEdge Exam

== Corporate affairs ==
=== Business trends ===
The key trends for Dell are (as of the financial year ending late January/early February):

	Revenue (US$ bn)	Net profit (US$ bn)	Employees (k)
2016	50.5	−1.1	101
2017	61.5	−3.6	138
2018	79.1	−2.8	145
2019	90.3	−2.3	157
2020	91.9	4.6	165
2021	86.7	2.2	158
2022	101	4.9	133
2023	101	2.4	133
2024	88.4	3.2	120

=== Senior leadership ===
==== List of chairmen ====
1. Michael Dell (1984– )

==== List of chief executives ====
1. Michael Dell (1984–2004)
2. Kevin Rollins (2004–2007)
3. Michael Dell (2007–present); second term

== List of Dell marketing slogans ==
- Be direct (1998–2001)
- Easy as Dell (2001–2004)
- Get more out of now (2004–2005)
- It's a Dell (2005–2006)
- Dell. Purely You (2006–2007)
- Yours is Here (2007–2011)
- The power to do more (2011–2023)
- Welcome to Now (2023-present)

== Acquisitions ==
List of companies acquired by Dell Inc.
Company acquired	Date of acquisition	Company notes	References
Alienware	2006	Manufacturer of high-end PCs for gamers	
EqualLogic	January 28, 2008	Acquired to gain a foothold in the iSCSI storage market. Because Dell already had an efficient manufacturing process, integrating EqualLogic's products into the company drove manufacturing prices down	
Perot Systems	2009	Perot Systems was a technology services and outsourcing company, mainly active in the health sector, founded by former presidential hopeful H. Ross Perot. The acquired business provided Dell with applications development, systems integration, and strategic consulting services through its operations in the US and 10 other countries. In addition, the acquisition of Perot brought a variety of business process outsourcing services, including claims processing and call center operations.	
KACE Networks	February 10, 2010	KACE Networks was a leader in systems management appliances.	
Boomi	November 2, 2010	Cloud integration leader	
Compellent Technologies	February 2011	The acquisition extended Dell's storage portfolio.	
Force10 networks	August 2011	By acquiring this company Dell now has the full Intellectual property for their networking portfolio, which was lacking on the Dell PowerConnect range as these products are powered by Broadcom or Marvell IM.	
AppAssure Software	February 24, 2012	Dell acquired the backup and disaster recovery software provider out of Reston, VA. AppAssure delivered 194 percent revenue growth in 2011 and over 3500% growth in the prior three years. AppAssure supported physical servers and VMware, Hyper-V and XenServer. The deal represents the first acquisition since Dell formed its software division under former CA CEO John Swainson. Dell added that it will keep AppAssure's 230 employees and invest in the company.	
SonicWall	May 9, 2012	A company with 130 patents, SonicWall develops security products, and is a network and data security provider.	
Wyse	April 2, 2012	A global market-leader for thin client systems.	
Clerity Solutions	April 3, 2012	Clerity, a company offering services for application (re)hosting, was formed in 1994 and has it headquarters in Chicago. At the time of the take-over approximately 70 people were working for the company.	
Quest Software	September 28, 2012		
Gale Technologies	November 16, 2012	A provider of infrastructure automation products. Gale Technologies was founded in 2008 and is headquartered in Santa Clara, California.	
Credant Technologies	December 18, 2012	A provider of storage protection services. Credant is the 19th acquisition in four years, as Dell had spent $13 billion on acquisitions since 2008 and $5 billion in the past year alone.	
StatSoft	March 24, 2014	A global provider of analytics software, in order to bolster its big data services offering.	
EMC²	October 12, 2015	Storage, virtualization, services, cloud, data center, security and compliance	

== Dell facilities ==
Dell's headquarters is located in Round Rock, Texas. As of 2013 the company employed about 14,000 people in central Texas and was the region's largest private employer, which has 2,100,000 square feet (200,000 m^{2}) of space. As of 1999 almost half of the general fund of the city of Round Rock originated from sales taxes generated from the Dell headquarters.

Dell previously had its headquarters in the Arboretum complex in northern Austin, Texas. In 1989 Dell occupied 127,000 square feet (11,800 m^{2}) in the Arboretum complex. In 1990, Dell had 1,200 employees in its headquarters. In 1993, Dell submitted a document to Round Rock officials, titled "Dell Computer Corporate Headquarters, Round Rock, Texas, May 1993 Schematic Design." Despite the filing, during that year the company said that it was not going to move its headquarters. In 1994, Dell announced that it was moving most of its employees out of the Arboretum, but that it was going to continue to occupy the top floor of the Arboretum and that the company's official headquarters address would continue to be the Arboretum. The top floor continued to hold Dell's board room, demonstration center, and visitor meeting room. Less than one month prior to August 29, 1994, Dell moved 1,100 customer support and telephone sales employees to Round Rock. Dell's lease in the Arboretum had been scheduled to expire in 1994.

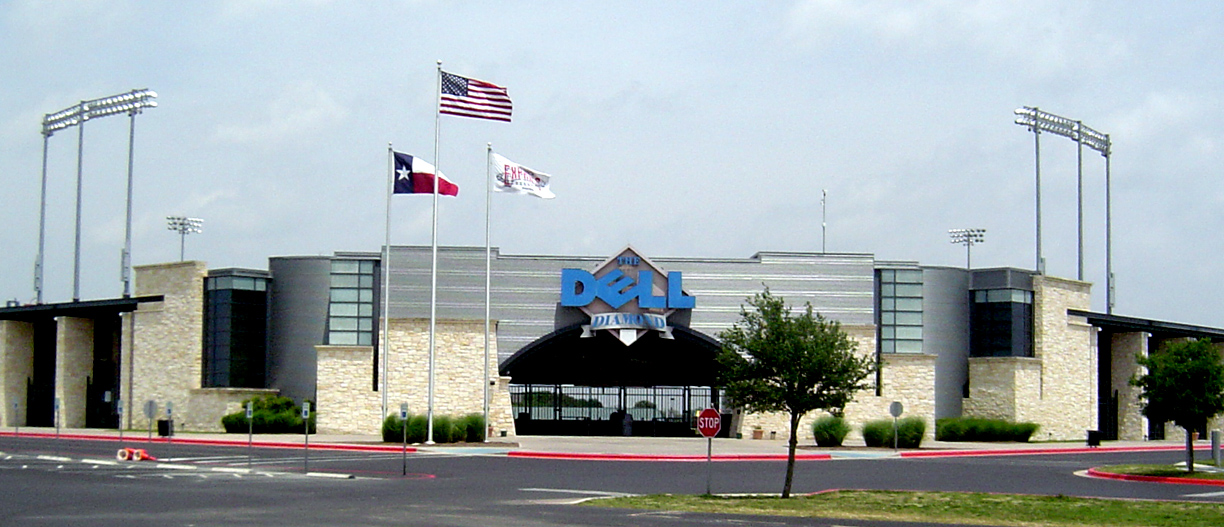
The company sponsors Dell Diamond, the home stadium of the Round Rock Express, the AAA minor league baseball affiliate of the Texas Rangers major league baseball team.

By 1996, Dell was moving its headquarters to Round Rock. As of January 1996, 3,500 people still worked at the current Dell headquarters. One building of the Round Rock headquarters, Round Rock 3, had space for 6,400 employees and was scheduled to be completed in November 1996. In 1998 Dell announced that it was going to add two buildings to its Round Rock complex, adding 1,600,000 square feet (150,000 m^{2}) of office space to the complex.

In 2000, Dell announced that it would lease 80,000 square feet (7,400 m^{2}) of space in the Las Cimas office complex in unincorporated Travis County, Texas, between Austin and West Lake Hills, to house the company's executive offices and corporate headquarters. 100 senior executives were scheduled to work in the building by the end of 2000. In January 2001, the company leased the space in Las Cimas 2, located along Loop 360. Las Cimas 2 housed Dell's executives, the investment operations, and some corporate functions. Dell also had an option for 138,000 square feet (12,800 m^{2}) of space in Las Cimas 3. After a slowdown in business required reducing employees and production capacity, Dell decided to sublease its offices in two buildings in the Las Cimas office complex. In 2002 Dell announced that it planned to sublease its space to another tenant; the company planned to move its headquarters back to Round Rock once a tenant was secured. By 2003, Dell moved its headquarters back to Round Rock. It leased all of Las Cimas I and II, with a total of 312,000 square feet (29,000 m^{2}), for about a seven-year period after 2003. By that year roughly 100,000 square feet (9,300 m^{2}) of that space was absorbed by new subtenants.

In 2008, Dell switched the power sources of the Round Rock headquarters to more environmentally friendly ones, with 60% of the total power coming from TXU Energy wind farms and 40% coming from the Austin Community Landfill gas-to-energy plant operated by Waste Management, Inc.

The US and India are the only countries that have all Dell's business functions and provide support globally: research and development, manufacturing, finance, analysis, and customer care. Dell was recognized as "India's Most Desired Brand in 2023", as per TRA's Most Desired Brands report 2023.

=== Manufacturing ===
From its early beginnings, Dell operated as a pioneer in the "configure to order" approach to manufacturing—delivering individual PCs configured to customer specifications. In contrast, most PC manufacturers in those times delivered large orders to intermediaries on a quarterly basis.

To minimize the delay between purchase and delivery, Dell has a general policy of manufacturing its products close to its customers. This also allows for implementing a just-in-time (JIT) manufacturing approach, which minimizes inventory costs. Low inventory is another signature of the Dell business model—a critical consideration in an industry where components depreciate very rapidly.

Dell's manufacturing process covers assembly, software installation, functional testing (including "burn-in"), and quality control. Throughout most of the company's history, Dell manufactured desktop machines in-house and contracted out the manufacturing of base notebooks for configuration in-house. The company's approach has changed, as cited in the 2006 Annual Report, which states, "We are continuing to expand our use of original design manufacturing partnerships and manufacturing outsourcing relationships." The Wall Street Journal reported in September 2008 that "Dell has approached contract computer manufacturers with offers to sell" their plants. By the late 2000s, Dell's "configure to order" approach of manufacturing—delivering individual PCs configured to customer specifications from its US facilities was no longer as efficient or competitive with high-volume Asian contract manufacturers as PCs became powerful low-cost commodities.

Assembly of desktop computers for the North American market formerly took place at Dell plants in Austin, Texas, (original location) and Lebanon, Tennessee, (opened in 1999), which were closed in 2008 and early 2009, respectively. The plant in Winston-Salem, North Carolina, opened in 2005 but ceased operations in November 2010. Most of the work that used to take place in Dell's US plants was transferred to contract manufacturers in Asia and Mexico, or some of Dell's own factories overseas. The Miami facility of its Alienware subsidiary remains in operation, while Dell continues to produce its servers (its most profitable products) in Austin, Texas.

Dell assembled computers for the EMEA market at the Limerick facility in the Republic of Ireland, and once employed about 4,500 people in that country. Dell began manufacturing in Limerick in 1991 and went on to become Ireland's largest exporter of goods and its second-largest company and foreign investor. On January 8, 2009, Dell announced that it would move all Dell manufacturing in Limerick to Dell's new plant in the Polish city of Łódź by January 2010. European Union officials said they would investigate a €52.7million aid package the Polish government used to attract Dell away from Ireland. European Manufacturing Facility 1 (EMF1, opened in 1990) and EMF3 form part of the Raheen Industrial Estate near Limerick. Dell Inc. has consolidated production into EMF3 (EMF1 now contains only offices). Subsidies from the Polish government did keep Dell for a long time. After ending assembly in the Limerick plant the Cherrywood Technology Campus in Dublin was the largest Dell office in the republic with over 1200 people in sales (mainly UK & Ireland), support (enterprise support for EMEA) and research and development for cloud computing, but no more manufacturing except Dell's Alienware subsidiary, which manufactures PCs in an Athlone, Ireland, plant. Whether this facility will remain in Ireland is not certain. Dell started production at EMF4 in Łódź, Poland, in late 2007.

Dell moved desktop, notebook and PowerEdge server manufacturing for the South American market from the Eldorado do Sul plant opened in 1999, to a new plant in Hortolândia, Brazil, in 2007.

== Products ==
=== Scope and brands ===
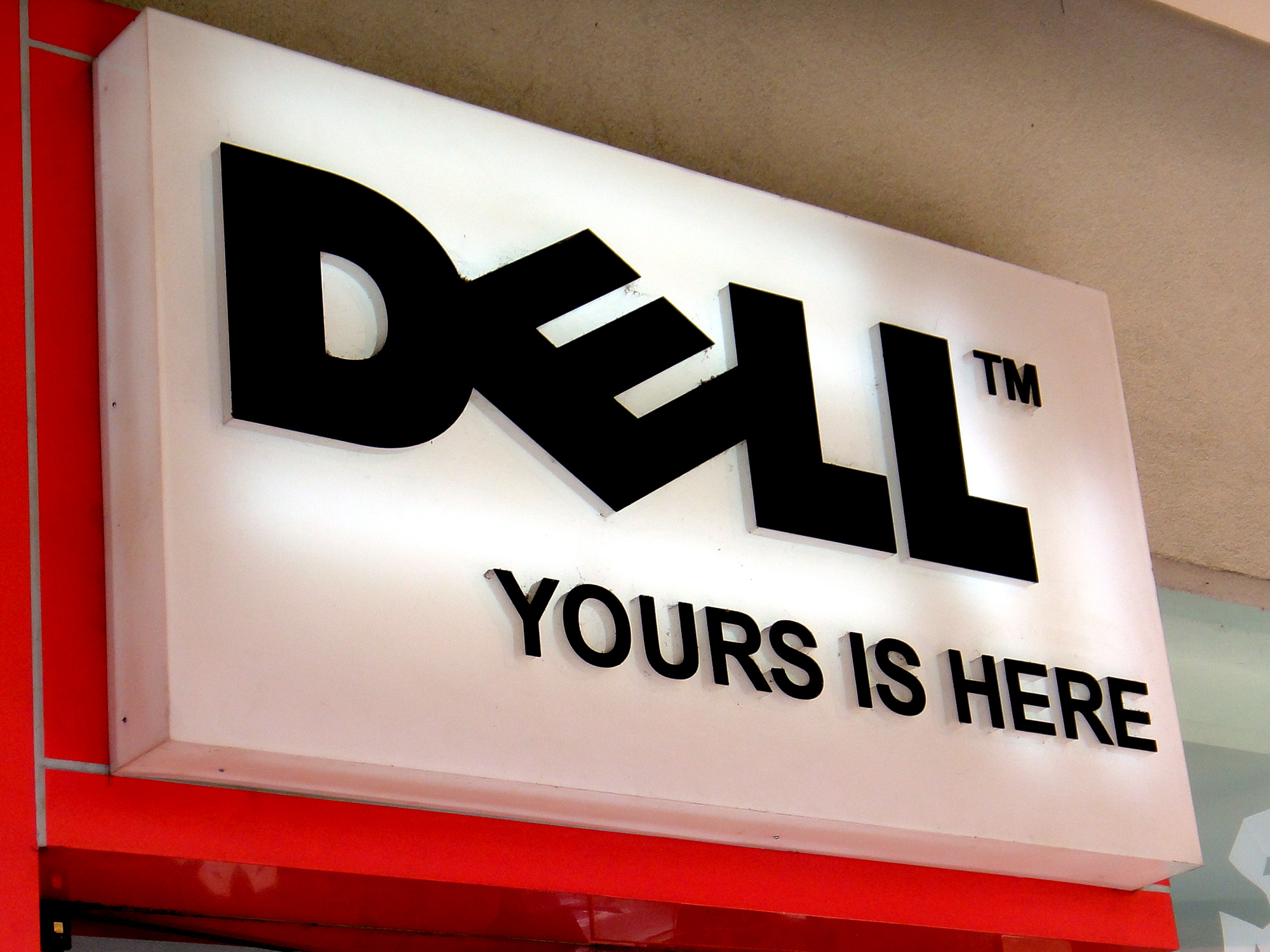
Dell's 2007–2011 tagline "Yours is Here", as seen at their Mall of Asia branch in Pasay, Philippines

Dell markets specific brand names to different market segments. Its Business/Corporate class includes:

- Dell Pro computer line (business-focused computers)
- Precision (workstation systems and high-performance "Mobile Workstation" notebooks)
- n Series (desktop and notebook computers shipped with Linux or FreeDOS installed)
- PowerEdge (business servers)
- PowerVault (direct-attach and network-attached storage)
- Dell Networking series (networking switches and gateways)
- EqualLogic (enterprise class iSCSI SANs)
- Dell AI Factory with NVIDIA (enterprise AI infrastructure)

Dell's Home Office/Consumer class includes:

- Dell laptop line (mainstream and entry-level laptops)
- XPS (high-end desktop and notebook computers)
- Alienware (high-performance gaming systems)

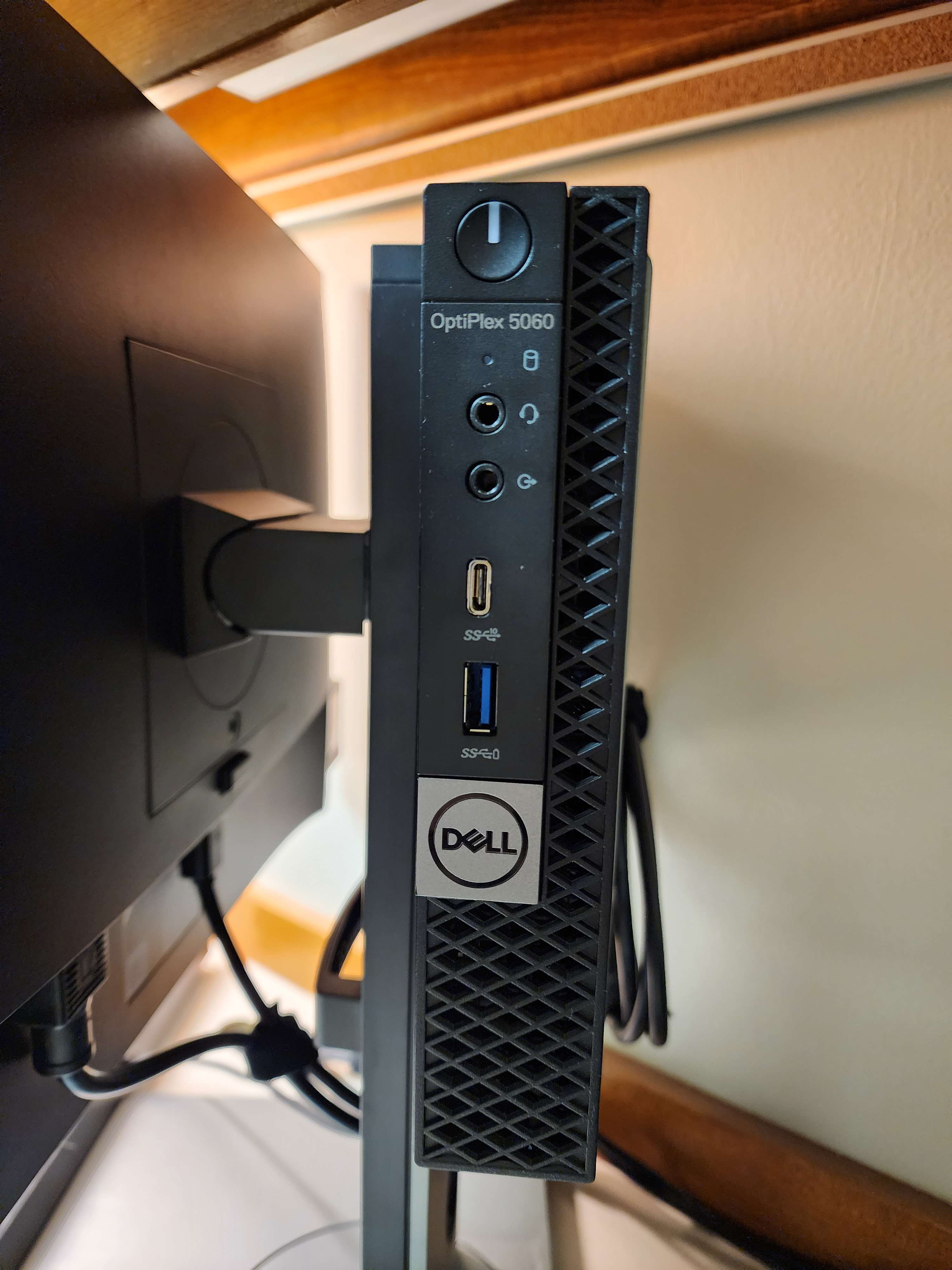
Dell OptiPlex 5060 Micro small-form-factor desktop computer mounted to Dell P2219H monitor

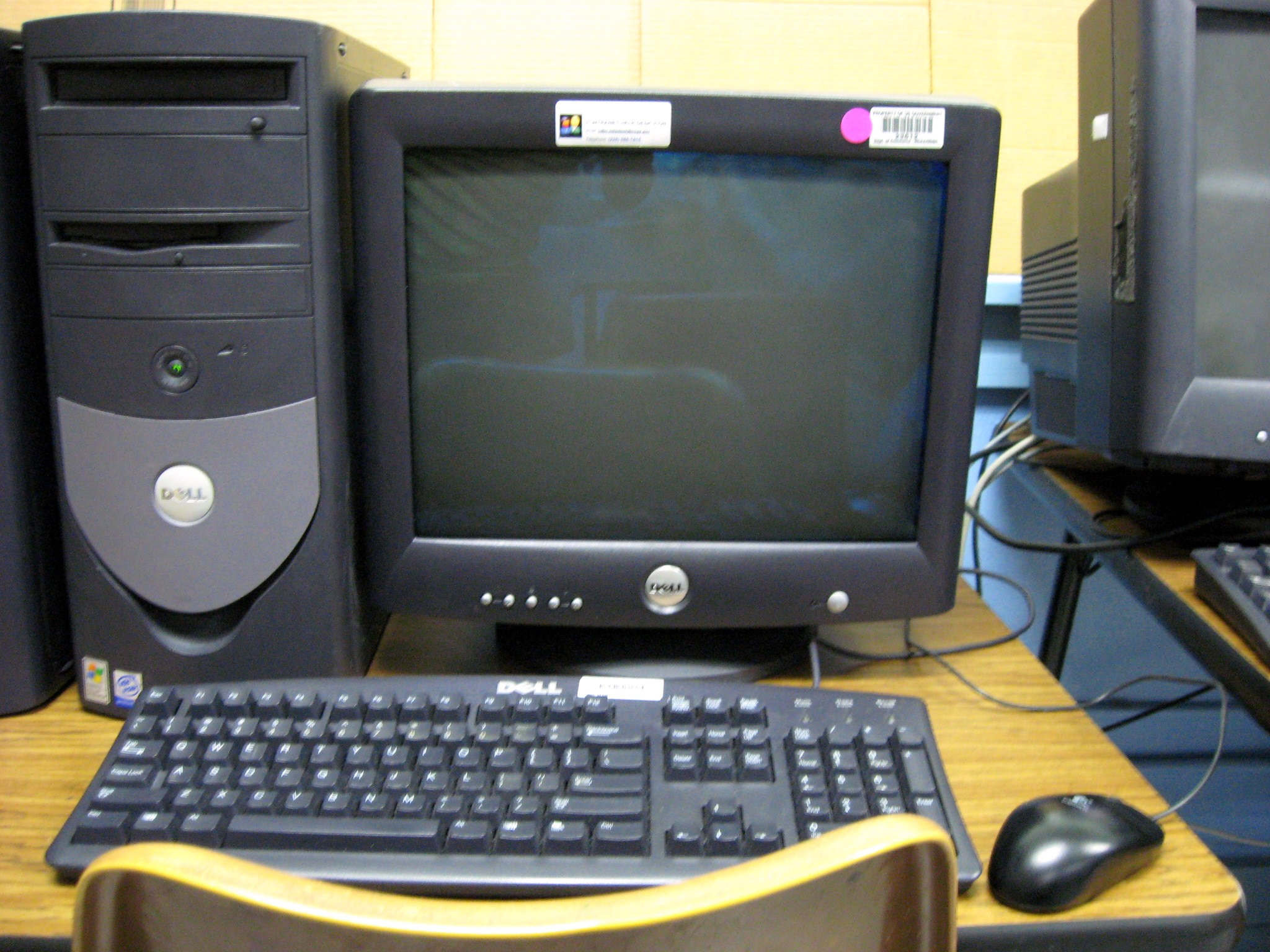
Dell Desktop Computer in school classroom

Dell's Peripherals class includes USB flash drives, LCD televisions, printers, docking stations, keyboards and mice, headsets, earbuds, and webcams. Dell monitors include LCD TVs, Plasma displays and projectors for HDTV and monitors. Dell UltraSharp is further a high-end brand of monitors.

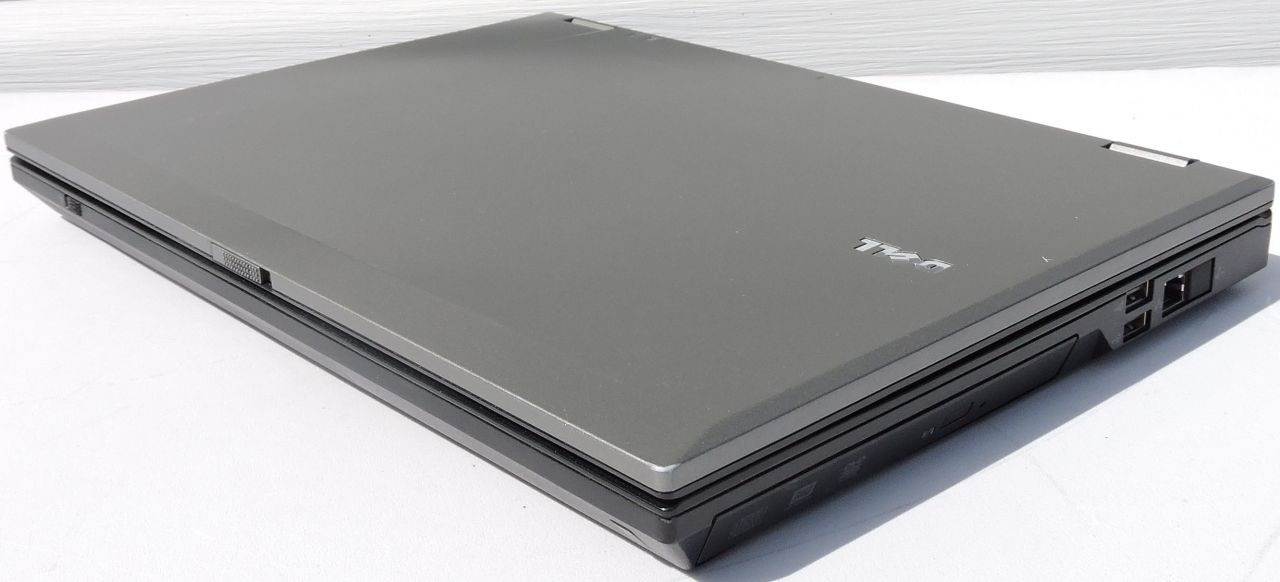
Dell Latitude E5410

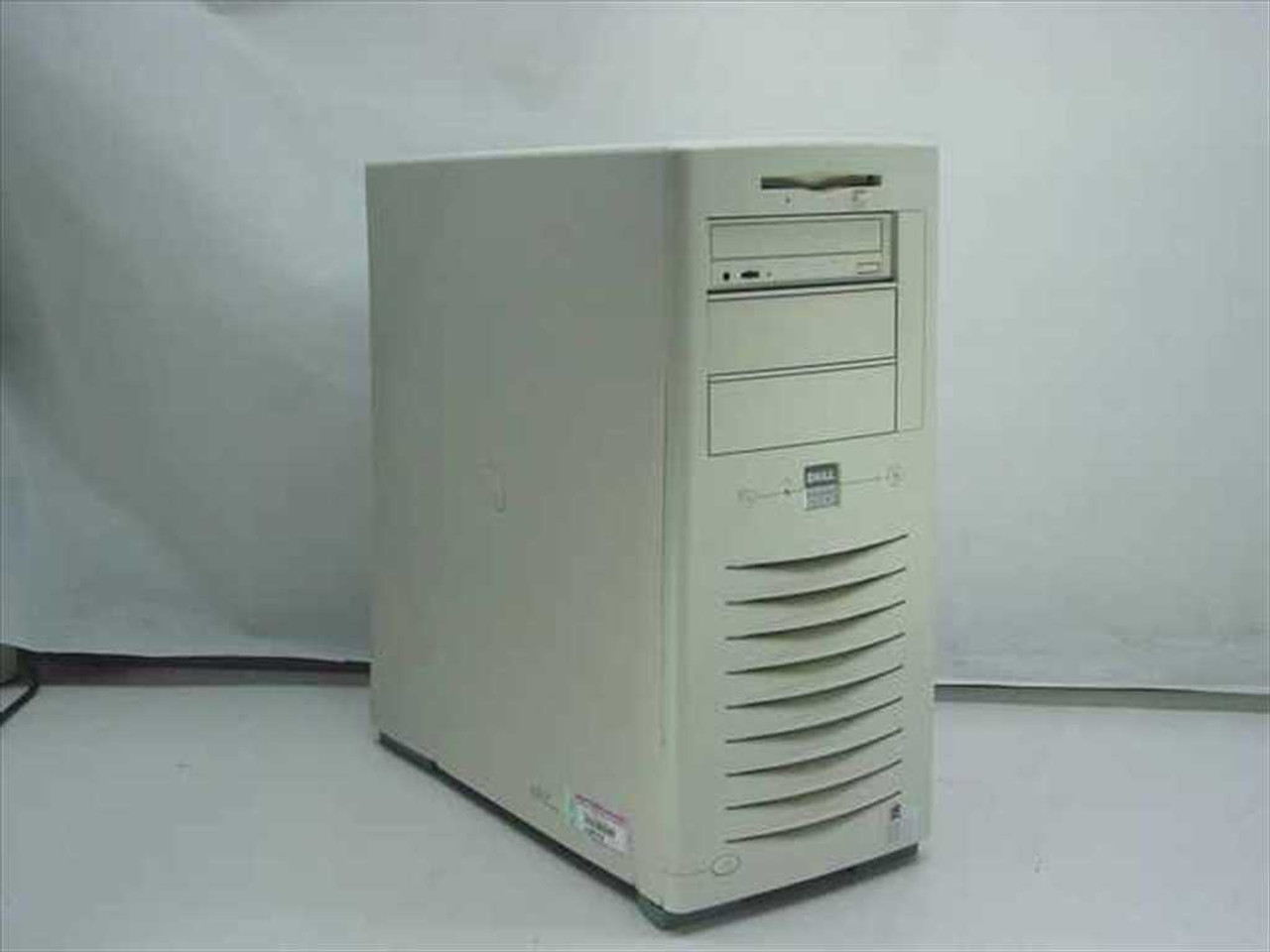
Dell Precision 420 Desktop

Dell service and support brands include the Dell Solution Station (extended domestic support services, previously "Dell on Call"), Dell Support Center (extended support services abroad), Dell Business Support (a commercial service-contract that provides an industry-certified technician with a lower call-volume than in normal queues), Dell Everdream Desktop Management ("Software as a service" remote-desktop management, originally a SaaS company founded by Elon Musk's cousin, Lyndon Rive, which Dell bought in 2007), and Your Tech Team (a support-queue available to home users who purchased their systems either through Dell's website or through Dell phone-centers).

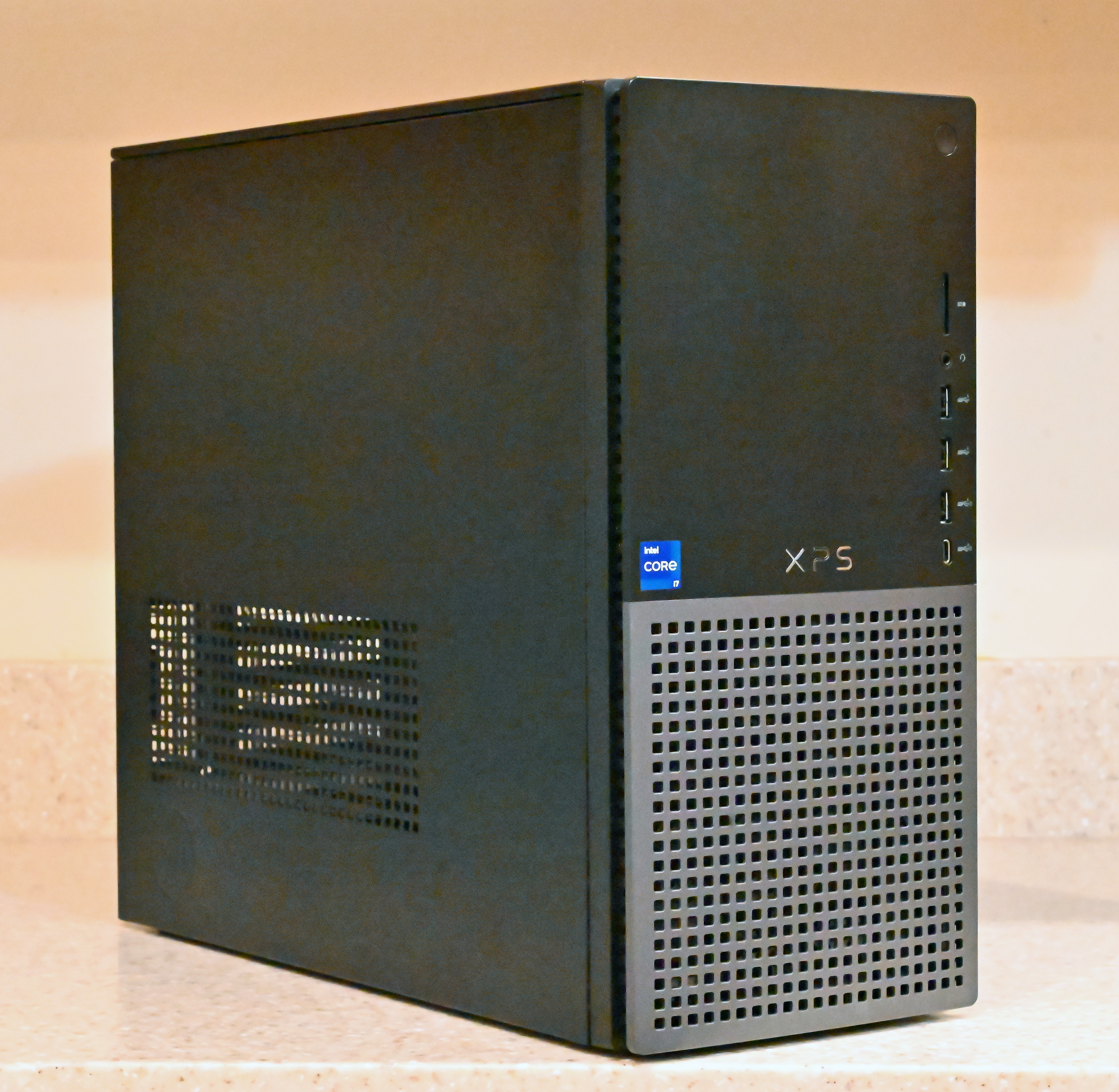
Dell XPS 8950 desktop computer

Discontinued products and brands include:

- Axim (PDA; discontinued April 9, 2007)
- Dimension (home and small office desktop computers; discontinued July 2007)
- Digital Jukebox (MP3 player; discontinued August 2006)
- G Series (high/medium-performance gaming laptops)
- Inspiron (medium-range desktop and notebook computers)
- Dell PowerApp (application-based servers)
- OptiPlex (desktop and tower computers previously supported to run server and desktop operating systems)
- Dell Unix (an SVR4-based Unix operating system for its Dell-branded PCs and workstations; discontinued 1993)
- Venue (smartphones and tablets)
- Dell Mobile Connect (Windows Mobile application; discontinued July 31, 2022)
- Vostro (office/small business desktop and notebook systems; discontinued 2024)
- Latitude (business-focused notebooks; discontinued 2025)
- Studio (mainstream desktop and laptop computers; discontinued 2011)
- Adamo (high-end luxury laptop; discontinued 2011)
- Force10 and PowerConnect (network switches; unified under Dell Networking brand in 2013)
- Dell Compellent (storage area networks; brand phased out following 2010 acquisition).

== Security ==
=== Self-signed root certificate ===
In November 2015, it emerged that several Dell computers had shipped with an identical pre-installed root certificate known as "eDellRoot". This raised such security risks as attackers impersonating HTTPS-protected websites such as Google and Bank of America and malware being signed with the certificate to bypass Microsoft software filtering. Dell apologized and offered a removal tool.

=== Absolute Security ===
In 2015, Dell continued their partnership with Absolute Security installing the company's security technology into Dell Android devices.

=== Dell Foundation Services ===
Also in November 2015, a researcher discovered that customers with diagnostic program Dell Foundation Services could be digitally tracked using the unique service tag number assigned to them by the program. This was possible even if a customer enabled private browsing and deleted their browser cookies. Ars Technica recommended that Dell customers uninstall the program until the issue was addressed.

== Commercial aspects ==
=== Marketing ===
Dell advertisements have appeared in several types of media including television, the Internet, magazines, catalogs, and newspapers. Some of Dell Inc's marketing strategies include lowering prices at all times of the year, free bonus products (such as Dell printers), and free shipping to encourage more sales and stave off competitors. In 2006, Dell cut its prices in an effort to maintain its 19.2% market share. This also cut profit margins by more than half, from 8.7 to 4.3 percent. To maintain its low prices, Dell continues to accept most purchases of its products via the Internet and through the telephone network, and to move its customer-care division to India and El Salvador.

A popular United States television and print ad campaign in the early 2000s featured the actor Ben Curtis playing the part of "Steven", a lightly mischievous blond-haired youth who came to the assistance of bereft computer purchasers. Each television advertisement usually ended with Steven's catch-phrase: "Dude, you're gettin' a Dell!"

A subsequent advertising campaign featured interns at Dell headquarters (with Curtis' character appearing in a small cameo at the end of one of the first commercials in this particular campaign).

In 2007, Dell switched advertising agencies in the US from BBDO to Working Mother Media. In July 2007, Dell released new advertising created by Working Mother to support the Inspiron and XPS lines. The ads featured music from the Flaming Lips and Devo who re-formed especially to record the song in the ad "Work it Out". Also in 2007, Dell began using the slogan "Yours is here" to say that it customizes computers to fit customers' requirements.

In 2011, Dell began hosting an annual conference titled "Dell World" at the Austin Convention Center in Austin, Texas. The event featured new technology and services provided by Dell and Dell's partners. After Dell and EMC merged in 2016, their annual conferences were combined into "Dell EMC World", hosted in Las Vegas, Nevada. It was renamed "Dell Technologies World" in 2018.

==== Dell partner program ====
In late 2007, Dell Inc. announced that it planned to expand its program to value-added resellers (VARs), giving it the official name of "Dell Partner Direct" and a new Website.

In 2013, Dell India started an ecommerce website with its Dell Partner GNG Electronics Pvt Ltd termed as Dell Express Ship Affiliate (DESA). The main objective was to reduce the delivery time. Customers who visited the Dell India official site and selected the option to buy online were redirected to the Dell affiliate website.

==== Criticisms of marketing of laptop security ====
In 2008, Dell received press coverage over its claim of having the world's most secure laptops, specifically, its Latitude D630 and Latitude D830. At Lenovo's request, the (US) National Advertising Division (NAD) evaluated the claim, and reported that Dell did not have enough evidence to support it.

=== Retail ===
Dell first opened their retail stores in India.

==== United States ====
In the early 1990s, Dell sold its products through Best Buy, Costco and Sam's Club stores in the United States. Dell stopped this practice in 1994, citing low profit margins on the business, exclusively distributing through a direct-sales model for the next decade. In 2003, Dell briefly sold products in Sears stores in the US. In 2007, Dell started shipping its products to major retailers in the US once again, starting with Sam's Club and Wal-Mart. Staples, the largest office-supply retailer in the US, and Best Buy, the largest electronics retailer in the US, became Dell retail partners later that same year.

===== Kiosks =====
Starting in 2002, Dell opened kiosk locations in the United States to allow customers to examine products before buying them directly from the company. Starting in 2005, Dell expanded kiosk locations to include shopping malls across Australia, Canada, Singapore and Hong Kong. On January 30, 2008, Dell announced it would shut down all 140 kiosks in the US due to expansion into retail stores. By June 3, 2010, Dell had also shut down all of its mall kiosks in Australia.

==== Retail stores ====
As of the end of February 2008, Dell products shipped to one of the largest office supply retailers in Canada, Staples Business Depot. In April 2008, Future Shop and Best Buy began carrying a subset of Dell products, such as certain desktops, laptops, printers, and monitors.

Since some shoppers in certain markets show reluctance to purchase technological products through the phone or the Internet, Dell has looked into opening retail operations in some countries in Central Europe and Russia. In April 2007, Dell opened a retail store in Budapest. In October of the same year, Dell opened a retail store in Moscow.

In the UK, HMV's flagship Trocadero store has sold Dell XPS PCs since December 2007. From January 2008 the UK stores of DSGi have sold Dell products (in particular, through Currys and PC World stores). As of 2008, the large supermarket chain Tesco has sold Dell laptops and desktops in outlets throughout the UK.

In May 2008, Dell reached an agreement with the office supply chain, Officeworks (part of Coles Group), to stock a few modified models in the Inspiron desktop and notebook range. These models have slightly different model numbers, but almost replicate the ones available from the Dell Store. Dell continued its retail push in the Australian market with its partnership with Harris Technology (another part of Coles Group) in November of the same year. In addition, Dell expanded its retail distributions in Australia through an agreement with the discount electrical retailer, The Good Guys, known for "Slashing Prices". Dell agreed to distribute a variety of makes of both desktops and notebooks, including Studio and XPS systems in late 2008. Dell and Dick Smith Electronics (owned by Woolworths Australia) reached an agreement to expand within Dick Smith's 400 stores throughout Australia and New Zealand in May 2009 (1 year since Officeworks—owned by Coles Group—reached a deal). The retailer has agreed to distribute a variety of Inspiron and Studio notebooks, with minimal Studio desktops from the Dell range. As of 2009, Dell continues to run and operate its various kiosks in 18 shopping centers throughout Australia. On March 31, 2010, Dell announced to Australian Kiosk employees that they were shutting down the Australian/New Zealand Dell kiosk program.

In Germany, Dell is selling selected smartphones and notebooks via Media Markt and Saturn, as well as some shopping websites.

=== Competition ===
Dell's major competitors include Lenovo, Hewlett-Packard (HP), Hasee, Acer, Fujitsu, Toshiba, Gateway, Sony, Asus, MSI, Panasonic, Samsung and Apple. Dell and its subsidiary, Alienware, compete in the enthusiast market against AVADirect, Falcon Northwest, VoodooPC (a subsidiary of HP), and other manufacturers. In the second quarter of 2006, Dell had between 18% and 19% share of the worldwide personal computer market, compared to HP with roughly 15%.

In late 2006, Dell lost its lead in the PC business to Hewlett-Packard. Both Gartner and IDC estimated that in the third quarter of 2006, HP shipped more units worldwide than Dell did. Dell's 3.6% growth paled in comparison to HP's 15% growth during the same period. The problem got worse in the fourth quarter, when Gartner estimated that Dell PC shipments declined 8.9% (versus HP's 23.9% growth). As a result, at the end of 2006 Dell's overall PC market share stood at 13.9% (versus HP's 17.4%).

IDC reported that Dell lost more server market share than any of the top four competitors in that arena. IDC's Q4 2006 estimates show Dell's share of the server market at 8.1%, down from 9.5% in the previous year. This represents an 8.8% loss year-over-year, primarily to competitors EMC and IBM. As of 2025, Dell is the third-largest PC manufacturer after Lenovo and HP Inc.

=== Partnership with EMC ===
In 2001, Dell and EMC entered into a partnership whereby both companies jointly design products, and Dell provided support for certain EMC products including midrange storage systems, such as fibre channel and iSCSI storage area networks. The relationship also promotes and sells OEM versions of backup, recovery, replication and archiving software. On December 9, 2008, Dell and EMC announced the multi-year extension, through 2013, of the strategic partnership with EMC. In addition, Dell expanded its product lineup by adding the EMC Celerra NX4 storage system to the portfolio of Dell/EMC family of networked storage systems and partnered on a new line of data deduplication products as part of its TierDisk family of data storage devices.

On October 17, 2011, Dell discontinued reselling all EMC storage products, ending the partnership 2 years early. In 2016, Dell acquired and merged with EMC in the largest tech merger to that date.

== Environmental record ==
Dell committed to reducing greenhouse gas emissions from its global activities by 40% by 2015, with the 2008 fiscal year as the baseline year. It is listed in Greenpeace's Guide to Greener Electronics that scores leading electronics manufacturers according to their policies on sustainability, climate and energy and how green their products are. In November 2011, Dell ranked 2nd out of 15 listed electronics makers (increasing its score to 5.1 from 4.9, which it gained in the previous ranking from October 2010).

Dell was the first company to publicly state a timeline for the elimination of toxic polyvinyl chloride (PVC) and brominated flame retardants (BFRs), which it planned to phase out by the end of 2009. It revised this commitment and now aims to remove toxics by the end of 2011 but only in its computing products. In March 2010, Greenpeace activists protested at Dell offices in Bangalore, Amsterdam and Copenhagen calling for Dell's founder and CEO Michael Dell to "drop the toxics" and claiming that Dell's aspiration to be 'the greenest technology company on the planet' was "hypocritical". Dell has launched its first products completely free of PVC and BFRs with the G-Series monitors (G2210 and G2410) in 2009.

In its 2012 report on progress relating to conflict minerals, the Enough Project rated Dell the eighth-highest of 24 consumer electronics companies.

In its enterprise product line, Dell has integrated high-efficiency power supply units (PSUs) to reduce energy consumption. As of 2025, numerous Dell server components have achieved the 80 PLUS Titanium certification, the highest energy efficiency tier for standard power delivery, ensuring a minimum of 96% efficiency at 50% load.

=== Green initiatives ===
Dell became the first company in the information technology industry to establish a product-recycling goal (in 2004) and completed the implementation of its global consumer recycling-program in 2006. On February 6, 2007, the National Recycling Coalition awarded Dell its "Recycling Works" award for efforts to promote producer responsibility. On July 19, 2007, Dell announced that it had exceeded targets in working to achieve a multi-year goal of recovering 275 million pounds of computer equipment by 2009. The company reported the recovery of 78 million pounds (nearly 40,000 tons) of IT equipment from customers in 2006, a 93-percent increase over 2005; and 12.4% of the equipment Dell sold seven years earlier.

On June 5, 2007, Dell set a goal of becoming the greenest technology company on Earth for the long term. The company launched a zero-carbon initiative that includes:

1. reducing Dell's carbon intensity by 15 percent by 2012
2. requiring primary suppliers to report carbon emissions data during quarterly business reviews
3. partnering with customers to build the "greenest PC on the planet"
4. expanding the company's carbon-offsetting program, "Plant a Tree for Me"

Dell reports its environmental performance in an annual Corporate Social Responsibility (CSR) Report that follows the Global Reporting Initiative (GRI) protocol. Dell's 2008 CSR report ranked as "Application Level B" as "checked by GRI".

The company aims to reduce its external environmental impact through an energy-efficient evolution of products, and also reduce its direct operational impact through energy-efficiency programs.

== Criticism ==
In the 1990s, Dell switched from using primarily ATX motherboards and PSU to using boards and power supplies with mechanically identical but differently wired connectors. This meant customers wishing to upgrade their hardware would have to replace parts with scarce Dell-compatible parts instead of commonly available parts. While motherboard power connections reverted to the industry standard in 2003, Dell remains secretive about their motherboard pin-outs for peripherals (such as MMC readers and power on/off switches and LEDs).

In 2005, complaints about Dell more than doubled to 1,533, after earnings grew 52% that year.

In 2006, Dell acknowledged that it had problems with customer service. Issues included call transfers of more than 45% of calls and long wait times. Dell's blog detailed the response: "We're spending more than a $100 million—and a lot of blood, sweat, and tears of talented people—to fix this." Later in the year, the company increased its spending on customer service to $150 million. Since 2018, Dell has seen significant increase in consumer satisfaction. Moreover, their customer service has been praised for its prompt and accurate answers to most questions, especially those directed to their social media support.

On August 17, 2007, Dell Inc. announced that after an internal investigation into its accounting practices it would restate and reduce earnings from 2003 through to the first quarter of 2007 by a total amount of between $50 million and $150 million, or 2 cents to 7 cents per share. The investigation, begun in November 2006, resulted from concerns raised by the U.S. Securities and Exchange Commission over some documents and information that Dell Inc. had submitted. It was alleged that Dell had not disclosed large exclusivity payments received from Intel for agreeing not to buy processors from rival manufacturer AMD. In 2010 Dell finally paid $100 million (equivalent to $143,900,000 in 2025) to settle the SEC's charges of fraud. Michael Dell and other executives also paid penalties and suffered other sanctions, without admitting or denying the charges.

In July 2009, Dell apologized after drawing the ire of the Taiwanese Consumer Protection Commission for twice refusing to honor a flood of orders against unusually low prices offered on its Taiwanese website. In the first instance, Dell offered a 19" LCD panel for $15. In the second instance, Dell offered its Latitude E4300 notebook at NT$18,558 (US$580), 70% lower than the usual price of NT$60,900 (US$1900). Concerning the E4300, rather than honor the discount taking a significant loss, the firm withdrew orders and offered a voucher of up to NT$20,000 (US$625) a customer in compensation. The consumer rights authorities in Taiwan fined Dell NT$1 million (US$31250) for customer rights infringements. Many consumers sued the firm for unfair compensation. A court in southern Taiwan ordered the firm to deliver 18 laptops and 76 flat-panel monitors to 31 consumers for NT$490,000 (US$15,120), less than a third of the normal price. The court said the event could hardly be regarded as mistakes, as the prestigious firm said the company mispriced its products twice on its Taiwanese website within 3 weeks.

After Michael Dell made a $24.4 billion buyout bid in August 2013 (equivalent to $3.321×10^{10} in 2025), activist shareholder Carl Icahn sued the company and its board in an attempt to derail the bid and promote his own forthcoming offer.

In 2020, the Australian Strategic Policy Institute accused at least 82 major brands, including Dell, of being connected to forced Uyghur labor in Xinjiang.

== See also ==
- List of laptop brands and manufacturers
- List of computer system manufacturers
- List of Dell ownership activities
