= HyTrust =

American company

- Industry: Information Technology; Computer software
- Founded: 2007
- Founders: Eric Chiu; Renata Budko; Boris Belov; Boris Strongin
- Headquarters: Mountain View, California
- Key people: John De Santis CEO; Mercedes Caprara CFO
- Website: hytrust.com

HyTrust, an Entrust company, is an American company. It specialized in security, compliance and control software for the virtualization of information technology infrastructure. The company was founded in 2007 and is based in Mountain View, California. Entrust Corp. acquired it in January 2021.

== History ==
HyTrust was founded in 2009, partnered by VMware, Symantec, Cisco Systems, and Citrix Systems, and backed by $5.5 million funding from Trident Capital and Epic Ventures. It further raised $10.5 million from Granite Ventures and Cisco Systems in 2010. In summer 2013, the company raised $18.5 million in an oversubscribed C round with investments from Intel Capital, In-Q-Tel, Carahsoft, Fortinet, and previous investors. The website also mentions McAfee, Trend Micro, CA Technologies, RSA, and VCE.

HyTrust was founded by the company's president, Eric Chiu, vice president Renata Budko, vice president Boris Strongin, and engineer Boris Belov. Before HyTrust, both Chiu and Budko worked for Cemaphore Systems – a company specializing in disaster recovery for Microsoft Exchange. HyTrust's CEO and chairman is John De Santis – formerly vice president of Cloud Services at VMware and chairman and CEO of TriCipher, a software security infrastructure company.

In November 2013, HyTrust acquired HighCloud Security, a cloud encryption and management software provider. This acquisition added encryption and key management to HyTrust's products. In spring 2015, the company raised $33 million in Series D funding. In 2017, the company raised $36 million and acquired DataGravity, a security company. HyTrust was acquired by Entrust in January 2021.

== Products and services ==
HyTrust's products are based on the company's patented intelligent security control system for virtualized ecosystems.

HyTrust CloudControl is a VMware vSphere-compatible virtual appliance that sits between the virtual infrastructure and its administrators. Whenever an administrative request is submitted to the infrastructure, the appliance determines whether that request complies with the organization's security policies before permitting or denying it accordingly. By logging all requests, records are produced that can be used for regulatory compliance and auditing, troubleshooting, and forensic analysis.

The company also provides private cloud, logging, active directory, root access, two-factor authentication, VI segmentation, host hardening, multi-tenant policy enforcement, secondary approval services, encryption, and key management and advises organizations on how to manage their virtualized and cloud computing environments.

HyTrust partnered with Intel in 2014 to create HyTrust BoundaryControl. The technology lets companies set policies to control access to cloud and virtualized IT where data can be stored. BoundaryCountrol is designed to work with the Intel TXT technology.

The company released HyTrust DataControl 3.0 in 2015. The technology encrypts data on virtual machines while they are at rest and keeps the data secure until being used.
