= Compellent Technologies =

Computer data storage

Compellent Technologies, Inc.

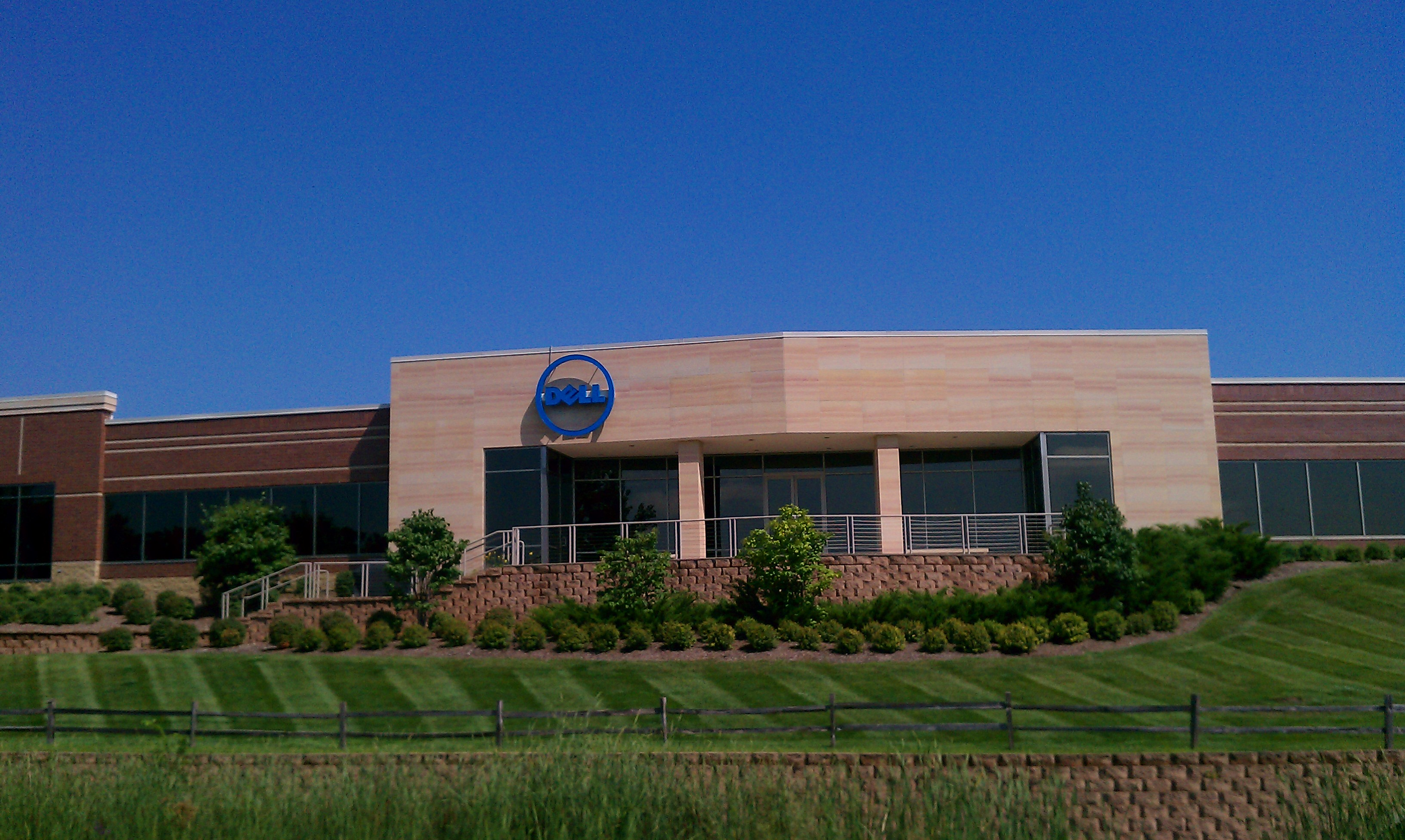
- Headquarters in Eden Prairie, Minnesota
- Company type: Public
- Traded as: Nasdaq: CML
- Industry: Data storage devices
- Founded: 2002; 24 years ago
- Founder: Larry Aszmann; John Guider; Phil Soran
- Defunct: February 22, 2011
- Fate: Acquired by Dell
- Successor: Dell Compellent
- Headquarters: 7625 Smetana Lane; Eden Prairie, Minnesota, United States
- Area served: Worldwide
- Key people: Michael Dell; (Chairman & CEO); Elliot Kahn; (CFO); Phil Soran; (Vice President); John Guider; (Vice President); Jack Judd; (Vice President)
- Products: Storage Center, Storage Center with NAS
- Revenue: ▲$ 125.3 million (2009)
- Number of employees: 565 (Start of 2011)
- Parent: Dell Technologies
- Website: www.dellemc.com/en-us/storage/sc-series.htm

Compellent Technologies, Inc., was an American manufacturer of enterprise computer data storage systems that provided block-level storage resources to small and medium sized IT infrastructures. The company was founded in 2002 and headquartered in Eden Prairie, Minnesota. Compellent's flagship product, Storage Center, is a storage area network (SAN) system that combines a standards-based hardware platform and a suite of virtualized storage management applications, including automated tiered storage through a proprietary process called "DataProgression", thin provisioning and replication. The company developed software and products aimed at mid-size enterprises and sold through a channel network of independent providers and resellers. Dell acquired the company in February 2011, after which it was briefly a subsidiary known as Dell Compellent.

== History ==
Compellent Technologies was founded in 2002 by Phil Soran, John Guider, and Larry Aszmann. The three had network storage and virtualization backgrounds.

The company had its initial public offering on October 15, 2007, became profitable for the first time in Q3 2008 and was profitable in consecutive quarters since. On February 11, 2010, it announced Q4 2009 revenues had increased 35 percent over Q4 2008, the company’s 17th consecutive quarter of revenue growth, with full year revenue of $125.3 million.

On December 13, 2010, Compellent announced it agreed to be acquired by Dell for approximately $960 million. The purchase was completed in February 2011 and the product line sold as Dell Compellent.

In the following years, Dell slowly phased out the Compellent brand name, naming the products simply Dell SCxxxx (for example, Dell SC9000).

== Products ==
=== Storage Center ===
Compellent’s storage area network (SAN) system, called "Storage Center", combines several virtualized storage-management applications with hardware. The product tracks metadata, information about each block of data stored on the Compellent system, including the date and time written, frequency of access, associated volume, type of disk drive used, type of data stored and RAID level. Large amounts of data are stored and managed on a granular level and assigned automatically to high-performance drives or large-capacity drives. Compellent said this method of data management can lower hardware, power and cooling costs."

The base configuration of Storage Center includes a dual, redundant disk array controller, disk enclosure, disk drives, connectivity hardware, and software modules.

For high availability purposes, I/O ports and power supplies are also redundant.

The operating system, called SCOS (Storage Center Operating System), is regularly updated. Software modules include:

- Storage virtualization
- Thin provisioning
- Automated tiered storage
- Continuous snapshots
- Remote replication and live volumes
- Boot from SAN

Compellent’s hardware supports different server/host interfaces (such as Fibre Channel and iSCSI) and drive technologies (such as solid state drives, Fibre Channel, Serial Attached SCSI and SATA disk drives). To expand the hardware, users add new drives or I/O cards to the existing system.

== Support and services ==
Compellent provides technical support and professional managed services through its Copilot team, housed at its Minnesota headquarters. Copilot technical support and service representatives provide maintenance, managed services, consultative services and training. SupportAssist (formerly: Phone Home) is an automated problem-detection service that remotely monitors each customer’s SAN and provides proactive alerting on issues.

== Environmental initiative ==
The company headquarters occupies the first commercial facility in Minnesota's Twin Cities region to receive a Leadership in Energy and Environmental Design (LEED) designation, now Gold-certified, from the United States Green Building Council. Compellent’s Eden Prairie campus has sustainable design elements such as waterless urinals and drip irrigation systems for landscaping that cut water consumption by 40 percent, energy-efficient HVAC equipment with carbon dioxide monitors, and low emission paints and adhesives. In addition, 75 percent of the building’s construction waste was recycled.

In 2009, Computerworld magazine honored Compellent as a top green IT vendor for its corporate and technology efforts to reduce power consumption and lower carbon emissions.

== Awards and recognition ==
- 2005 - Storage Magazine Bronze Product of the Year - Disk and Disk Subsystems
- 2006 - CRN Emerging Vendors - No. 1 Storage Standout
- 2006 - TechWorld UK Recommends - Compellent Storage Centre
- 2006 - InfoWorld Technology of the Year - Best SAN
- 2007 - CRN 50 Emerging Vendors You Should Know
- 2008 - Gold "Best of VMWorld 2008" in Hardware for Virtualization
- 2008 - Microsoft Partner of the Year for Advanced Infrastructure Solutions, Storage Solutions
- 2008 - InfoWorld Technology of the Year - Best SAN
- 2008 - Ernst & Young Entrepreneurs of the Year - Upper Midwest Region
- 2008 - Diogenes Labs - Storage Magazine Quality Awards for Midrange Arrays
- 2009 - Network Computing UK Technology Project of the Year - London Borough of Hillingdon
- 2009 - CRN Channel Chiefs
- 2009 - ComputerWorld Top 12 Green IT Vendors
- 2010 - InfoWorld Technology of the Year Award
- 2010 - Business Solutions Best Channel Vendor List
