= Thermique Technologies =

Thermique Technologies, LLC, is a manufacturing company in Chicago, Illinois, best known for researching and developing new applications for heated glass technology.

== History ==
Thermique Technologies is a wholly owned subsidiary of Engineered Glass Products (EGP), which was founded in 1947 in Chicago. EGP is best known for manufacturing heat-reflective glass panels for use in high-temperature home appliances such as self-cleaning ovens. In 2002, EGP introduced a glass panel that not only reflected heat but also generated it. These glass panels could be used as a heating element in home appliances and other commercial applications. EGP marketed these glass panels under the brand name "Thermique heated glass". The first commercial use of Thermique heated glass was in a display case for warm foods. In 2005, EGP introduced a towel warmer with a glass heating element called the Thermique Towel Warmer. That same year, EGP became the first company to earn UL approval to manufacture a heated glass pane for architectural window units. In 2006, EGP created Thermique Technologies as a separate entity in charge of its heated glass products and product development. EGP also continues to manufacture heat-reflective glass under another subsidiary, Marsco Glass Products.

== Corporate management ==
In 1995, general manager Mike Hobbs engineered a management buyout of EGP, then known as Marsco Manufacturing. As the new owner and CEO, Hobbs invested in developing new technologies to diversify the company's product offerings. He oversaw the development of Thermique heated glass and the creation of Thermique Technologies as a separate entity. Hobbs is CEO of both EGP and Thermique Technologies.

== Heated glass technology ==
Electrically heated glass was first developed in World War II to prevent aircraft windshields from frosting over and obscuring visibility. Since then, this technology has become almost universally used in aviation as well as supermarket freezers, where glass doors must remain clear for customers to see the merchandise.

In order to electrically heat glass, a microscopic tin(II) oxide coating is applied to a pane of ordinary float glass. This coating is perfectly transparent and conducts electricity. An electrical current is supplied by two busbars located on opposite sides of the glass. The electrical resistance of the Tin Oxide coating produces heat energy. This heat radiates from the glass in the form of infrared energy. The busbars are typically connected to a power control unit that regulates the flow of electricity and thus the temperature of the glass.

Thermique Technologies developed and patented a specialized control unit that provides adjustable temperature control up to 350 °F (177 °C); most commercial applications require much lower temperatures.

== Products ==
Thermique Technologies manufactures a family of patented glass towel warmers for sale directly to consumers.

The company also designs and manufactures custom components for other equipment manufacturers, including heated glass shelving for convenience store display cases and condensation-free panes for use in architectural window units.
