= UsNIC =

usNIC (user-space NIC) is Cisco's low-latency computer networking product for MPI over 10 Gigabit Ethernet in high-performance computing. It operates at the OSI model's data link layer (Ethernet frames) or the network layer (UDP packets) to eliminate the overhead of TCP within a data center. usNIC is shipped as firmware (with associated device drivers) for Cisco's "VIC" (virtual interface card) series of network adapters, and support has been contributed to Open MPI.
