= Eaton BladeUPS =

The Eaton BladeUPS is a modular three-phase UPS system consisting of individual 6U 12 kW UPS units which can be paralleled together to create up to a 60 kW N+1 redundant UPS. A feature of the BladeUPS is that the 6U cabinet houses both the UPS electronics and batteries; other modular systems house them separately. The high power density and 6U form factor of the BladeUPS are targeted at the growing power demands of IT servers and equipment, especially blade servers.

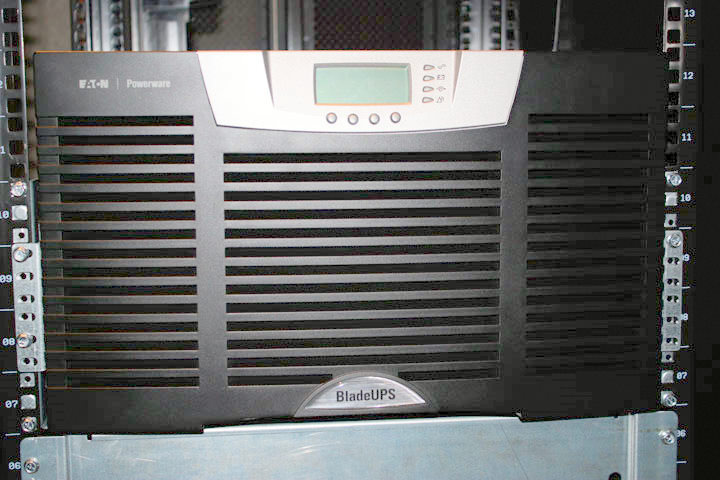
Eaton BladeUPS mounted in a 19-inch rack

The BladeUPS does not fall into a defined category for UPS type as it is a hybrid of a line interactive and online architecture, which Eaton calls Double Conversion on Demand. During normal operation the BladeUPS operates as a line interactive UPS allowing it to be energy efficient. When power conditions fluctuate outside preset standards, the unit switches into online mode (also known as double conversion). Software upgrades by Eaton have allowed BladeUPS owners to defeat this hybrid architecture and force the unit to operate entirely in online (double conversion) mode.

Eaton discontinued the BladeUPS in 2023 and announced its replacement, the Eaton 93PX in 2025:

== Software ==
BladeUPS ships with Eaton’s LanSafe software which allows for UPS monitoring and commands. The BladeUPS is compatible with Eaton’s Power Xpert and FORESEER software which provide additional monitoring and functionality.

== Battery runtime ==
Up to four extended battery modules can be connected to each BladeUPS providing additional runtime.

Single module		Runtime in minutes				
Load kW	Load %	Internal battery	+1 EBM	+2 EBM	+3 EBM	+4 EBM
12	100	4.7	9.5	17	27	34
11	92	5.4	10.9	20	30	38
10	83	6.2	13	22	33	42
9	75	7.3	15	24	38	48
8	67	8.7	18	28	43	55
7	58	10.7	23	32	50	64
6	50	13.6	27	42	60	76
5	42	18.5	33	51	73	94
4	33	23	42	66	94	120
3	25	30	56	89	128	165
2	17	44	85	137	199	258

== Awards ==
BladeUPS was named a 2007 searchdatacenter.com Gold Product of the Year.
