= Intel Modular Server System =

Blade server system

The Intel Modular Server System (IMS) is a blade system built on Intel Multi-Flex Technology (MFT) using their own motherboards and processors. The Intel Modular Server System consists of an Intel Modular Server Chassis, up to six diskless Compute Blades, an integrated storage area network (SAN), and three to five Service Modules. The system was formally announced in January 2008. The server is aimed at small to medium businesses with "50 to 300 employees".

== Intel Modular Server Chassis ==
The Modular Server Chassis comes in two versions; the MFSYS25 and MFSYS35. The key difference between these two versions is that the MFSYS25's integrated hard disk drive (HDD) bay accommodates fourteen 2.5" HDDs, while the MFSYS35's integrated HDD bay accommodates six 3.5" HDDs. Both versions have two Main Fan Modules, six Compute Blade bays, five Service Module slots, and up to four power supply units in an N+1 configuration.

== Service Modules ==
There are three types of Service Modules used in the Intel Modular Server System; the Storage Control Module, the Ethernet Switch Module, and the Chassis Management Module. An Intel Modular Server Chassis accommodates one Chassis Management Module, up to two Storage Control Modules, and up to two Ethernet Switch Modules. The addition of a second Ethernet Switch Module and/or Storage Control Module permits high availability and load balancing.

The Chassis Management Module is used to manage the Intel Modular Server Chassis' integrated SAN, the other two to four Service Modules, and the Compute Blades.

The Storage Control Module supports Intel Matrix RAID, and manages the RAID partitioning of the HDDs in the integrated HDD bay; as well as the creation, assignment, replication and destruction of volumes on the HDDs' partitions.

The Ethernet Switch Module is a managed Gigabit Ethernet switch that provides the installed Compute Blades with connectivity to each other and to external Ethernet networks.

== Compute Blades ==
Two types of Compute Blade can be used, in any combination, in the Intel Modular Server Enclosure; the MFS5000SI and the MFS5520VI. Both Compute Modules are dual-socket systems, which each have an integrated SAS HBA (for accessing volumes on the integrated SAN), an integrated Gigabit Ethernet port, and integrated graphics.

The Compute Blades are referred to as "Compute Modules" in Intel literature. The MFS5000SI Compute Blade uses up to two Intel Xeon 5100, 5200, 5300 or 5400 processors; and supports up to 32 GB of RAM, running at either 1066 MHz or 1333 MHz. The MFS5520VI Compute Blade uses up to two Intel Xeon 5500 or 5600 processors; and supports up to 192 GB of RAM running at 800 MHz, 1066 MHz or 1333 MHz (note that 1333 MHz is supported only with 8 GB or smaller DIMMs).

The diskless nature of the Compute Blades means personnel can quickly swap out a failed unit, and have reassign the failed Compute Blade's volumes to the replacement. This can facilitate increased uptime in a production environment.

== Integrated Storage Area Network ==
The integrated SAN consists of the HDD module (which accommodates up to fourteen 2.5" HDDs in the MFSYS25 chassis, and up to six 3.5" HDDs in the MFSYS35 chassis) and the Storage Control Module(s). Each Compute Blade accesses volumes, which are assigned to it by connecting to the Storage Control Module(s) through its integrated SAS HBA.
