= VRTX =

VRTX may refer to:

- Versatile Real-Time Executive, a real-time operating system
- Vertex Pharmaceuticals (Nasdaq stock symbol)
- PowerEdge VRTX, a computer hardware product line from Dell
