= Edward A. Bacon =

American businessman and Republican politician

Edward A. Bacon (1897–1968) was born in Milwaukee, Wisconsin and attended the Milton Academy from 1912 to 1916. In 1918, Bacon served in United States Marine Corps and earned an A.B. from Harvard University by 1920.

From 1920 to 1926, Bacon was employed by the Cutler-Hammer Corporation in Milwaukee, Wisconsin. From 1926 to 1933, he was Vice-President of the First Wisconsin National Bank. Almost simultaneously, he was the director, vice president, and treasurer of the Wisconsin Bankshares Corporation. From 1933 to 1935, he was a reorganization consultant in Wisconsin before returning to Cutler-Hammer as a member of the board of directors and as company comptroller. Bacon ended private life as the president and owner of Smith Steel Foundry Company from 1937 to 1941.

Bacon began his foray into public life in 1940 as the Republican National Committee representative from Wisconsin (a position he held until 1944). He also served, from 1941 to 1946, as a commander in the United States Navy Reserve. Following the war, from 1945 to 1946, Bacon served on the Navy Price Adjustment Board. From 1945 to 1952, he was employed by the Export-Import Bank. From 1953 to 1960, Bacon was Chairman of the Air Coordinating Committee's Executive Council.

In 1954, Bacon served a short term as Assistant to the Secretary of the Army for Canal Zone Affairs, and by 1955 had left to serve as Deputy Assistant Secretary of the Army for Financial Management (a position he held until 1960. During this period, in 1958, Bacon was also a member of the Tolls Committee of the Saint Lawrence Seaway, participated in Operation Deep Freeze in Antarctica, and served as a member of the Interstate Commission on the Potomac River Basin. From 1959 to 1961, Brown was the U.S. Chairman on the International Joint Commission between the United States and Canada. He retired soon after and died in 1968.
