= Engineered Glass Products =

Glass production company

Engineered Glass Products, LLC, (or EGP) in Chicago, Illinois, is the parent company of Marsco Glass Products, LLC, and Thermique Technologies, LLC.

== History ==
Marsco Manufacturing (later Engineered Glass Products) was founded in 1947 as a manufacturer of specialized glass products, including customized dials and gauges. With the arrival of television, Marsco began to produce protective gray glass shields for television tubes.

In the 1970s, Marsco engineers introduced a heat-resistant coating for glass that expanded the uses for glass in kitchen appliances like self-cleaning ovens. Marsco then formed partnerships with industry names like General Electric to become a supplier of heat-resistant coated glass in North America.

In 1995, general manager Mike Hobbs engineered a management buyout of the company and began to modernize the company’s corporate structure. Hobbs refocused the company on research and diversification of technology. Fred Fowler signed on as company president to direct internal operations as Marsco pursued its new mission.

In 2002, Marsco engineers developed and later patented a new control technology for electrically heated glass. This technology allowed Marsco to manufacture glass panes that radiate infrared heat energy up to 350 degrees Fahrenheit (177 degrees Celsius) with adjustable temperature control.

The first commercial application of this control technology was a heated glass shelf for displaying warm foods in merchandising cases. Next, the company developed a towel warmer with a glass heating element.

In 2006, Marsco Manufacturing transformed into Engineered Glass Products. The company then created two subsidiaries: Marsco Glass Products, which continues to manufacture heat-resistant coated glass for home appliances, and Thermique Technologies, which manufactures heated glass products and components.

== Corporate management ==
In 1995, general manager Mike Hobbs engineered a management buyout of EGP, then known as Marsco Manufacturing. Hobbs oversaw the development of Thermique heated glass and the creation of Thermique Technologies as a separate entity. Hobbs is CEO of both EGP and Thermique Technologies. Fred Fowler is a president of EGP and Marsco Glass Products.

== Products ==
Designed for safety and energy savings, the company’s Heat Barrier coating is applied to one side of the glass in the HBI product line and both sides of the glass in the HBII product line.
