= RLX Technologies =

Computer server company (1999-2005)

- Industry: Computer hardware, computer software, computer systems
- Founded: 1999; 27 years ago
- Founder: Christopher Hipp
- Defunct: October 2005; 21 years ago
- Fate: acquired by HP
- Headquarters: The Woodlands, Texas, United States
- Area served: United States
- Key people: Doug Erwin (CEO)
- Products: Blade servers, server management software

RLX Technologies was a computer company based in The Woodlands, Texas. Founded in 1999 by Christopher Hipp, one of the inventors of the blade server, and former Compaq employees, the company pioneered the use of blade servers, a compact, stripped-down computer server that includes all of the necessary components to operate as a computer while taking up minimal space on a standard 19-inch rack and minimizing power consumption. It became part of Hewlett-Packard in 2005.

== History ==
RLX was first founded in 1999 as RocketLogix, Inc. with a connection to a Dallas-based investment firm, Cracken, Harkey & Co. After Hipp convinced the firm that there was a need for a new efficient web server concept, they agreed to build an investment profile for RocketLogix. Former Compaq executives helped to raise money, including Rod Canion (founder and CEO of Compaq) and Robert W. Stearns (former Compaq SVP of Corporate Development, now at venture capitalist firm Sternhill Partners).

After development of their blade architecture, the company changed its name in 2001 to RLX Technologies. This change coincided with the company's move to The Woodlands. Former Compaq executives Gary Stimac and Michael S. Swavely became CEO and President of RLX, respectively.

In 2004 RLX decided to shift their focus away from hardware development and focus their efforts solely on their blade server management system, Control Tower. This shift was necessitated by a decline in the server market, largely due to the dotcom gloom.

Christopher Hipp and David Kirkeby applied for a patent on their design on July 20, 2000, and the United States Patent and Trademark Office awarded patent 6411506 for a "High density web server chassis system and method" on June 25, 2002.

After 5 years of operation, RLX was bought by Hewlett-Packard in October 2005.
