= Eaton Corporation =

Multinational power management company

Eaton Corporation plc

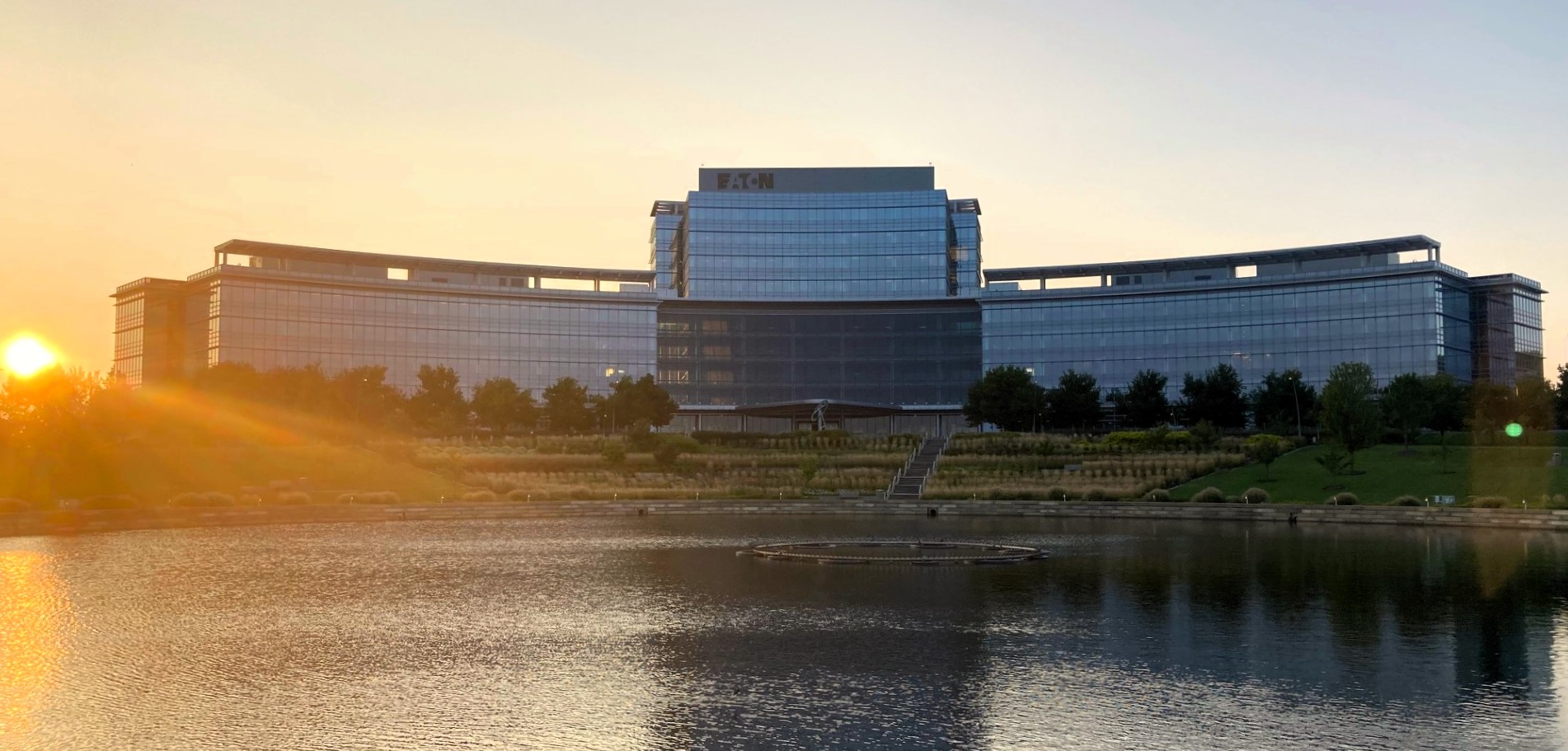
- Administrative center in Beachwood, Ohio
- Formerly: Torbensen Gear and Axle Co. (1911–1916); Torbensen Axle Company (1916–1919); Eaton Axle Company (1919–1920); Eaton Axle & Spring Company (1923–1932); Eaton Manufacturing Company (1932–1965); Eaton Yale & Towne Inc. (1965–1971); Eaton Corporation (1971–2013)
- Type: Public
- Traded as: NYSE: ETN; S&P 500 component
- ISIN: IE00B8KQN827
- Industry: Conglomerate
- Founded: 1911; 115 years ago
- Founders: Joseph Oriel Eaton II; Viggo Torbensen
- Headquarters: Dublin, Ireland
- Area served: Worldwide
- Key people: Paulo Ruiz (Chairman & CEO); Olivier Leonetti (CFO); Heath Monesmith (President & COO Electrical Sector); Peter Denk (President & COO Industrial Sector)
- Revenue: ▲US$27.4 billion (2025)
- Net income: ▲US$4.09 billion (2025)
- Number of employees: 94,000 (2024)
- Divisions: Electrical Sector; Industrial Sector: Aerospace; Filtration; Golf Pride; Vehicle; eMobility
- Website: eaton.com

Eaton Corporation plc is an American-Irish multinational power management company, with global headquarters at the Eaton House in Dublin and a primary administrative center in Beachwood, Ohio. Eaton has more than 85,000 employees and sells products to customers in more than 175 countries.

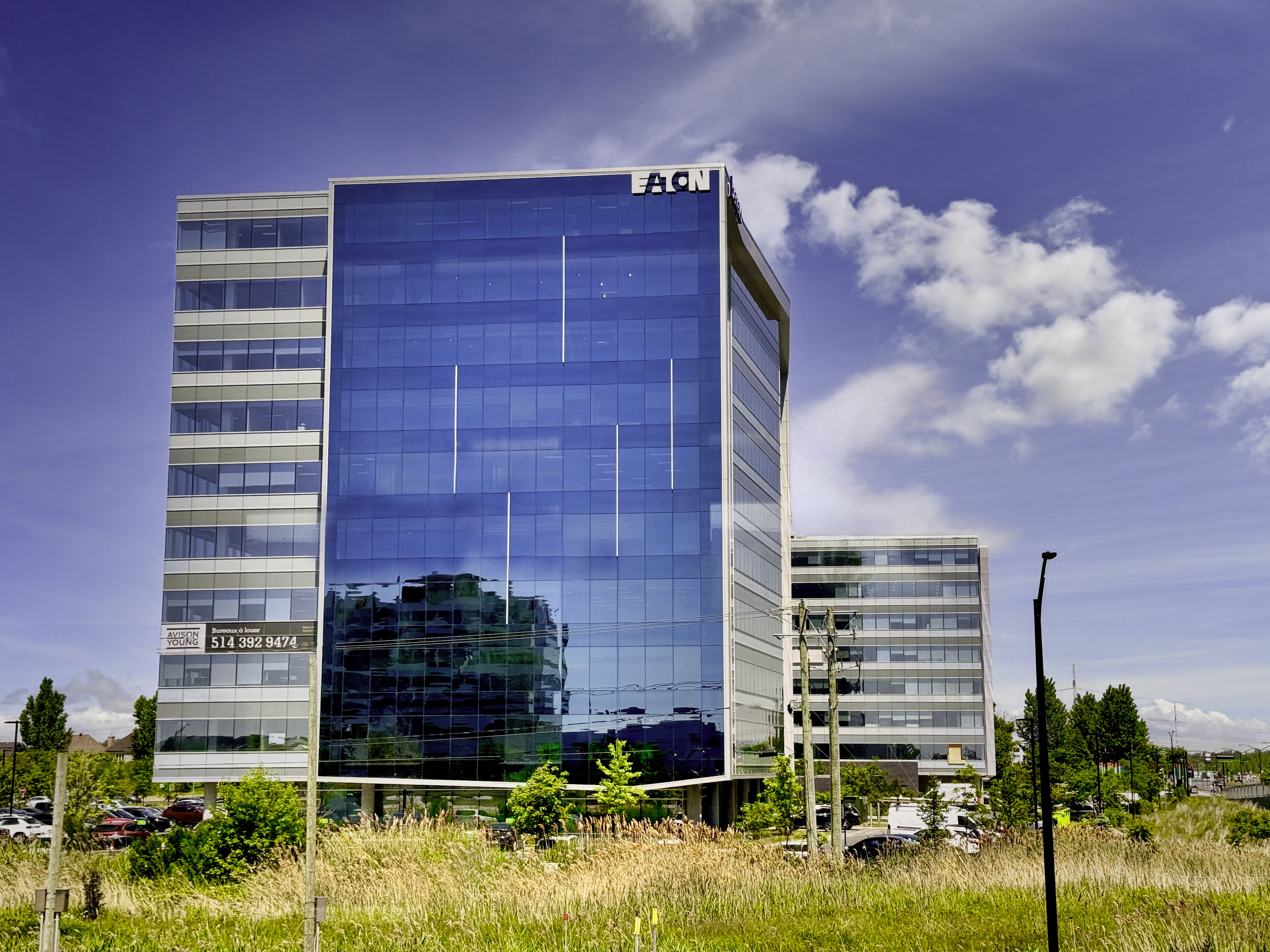
An Eaton Corporation office building in Brossard, Quebec

Eaton Corporation at 9th Bengaluru Space Expo 2026, BIEC

== History ==
In 1911, Joseph O. Eaton, brother-in-law Henning O. Taube and Viggo V. Torbensen, incorporated the Torbensen Gear and Axle Co. in Bloomfield, New Jersey. With financial backing from Torbensen's mother, the company was set to manufacture Torbensen's patented internal-gear truck axle. In 1914, the company moved to Cleveland, Ohio, to be closer to its core business, the automotive industry.

The Torbensen Axle Company incorporated in Ohio in 1916, succeeding the New Jersey corporation. A year later, Republic Motor Truck Company, Torbensen's largest customer bought out the company. But Eaton and Torbensen were not content and bowed out of Republic to form the Eaton Axle Company in 1919. A year later, in 1920, Eaton Axle Company merged with Standard Parts. Standard Parts went in receivership later the same year and was later liquidated. In 1923, Eaton bought the Torbensen Axle Co. back from Republic and changed the name to the Eaton Axle and Spring Company.

Eaton officers believed the quickest way to grow the business was through acquisitions and began buying companies in the automotive industry. By 1932, the diversified company changed its name to Eaton Manufacturing Company. In 1937, Eaton became international by opening a manufacturing plant in Canada. In 1958 Eaton Corporation acquired Fuller Manufacturing. The company name changed once again in 1965 to Eaton Yale & Towne Inc. after the acquisition of Yale & Towne Manufacturing Co. in 1963. Stockholders approved the change to the company's current name in 1971. In 1978, Eaton Corporation acquired Samuel Moore & Company, Kenway Systems, and Cutler-Hammer.

== Current work ==
Eaton's businesses are divided into the following sectors:

=== Electrical ===
The electrical sector's products include circuit breakers, switchgear, busway, UPS systems, power distribution units, panel boards, load centers, motor controls, meters, sensors, relays, PLCs, HMIs, and inverters. The main markets for the Electrical Americas and Electrical Rest of World segments are industrial, institutional, government, utility, commercial, residential, information technology and original equipment manufacturer customers.

=== Aerospace ===
For the aerospace industry, Eaton manufactures and markets a line of systems and components for hydraulic, fuel, motion control, pneumatic systems and engines.

=== Mobility ===
The Mobility Group comprises the company's Vehicle and eMobility segments, including the Roadranger division providing:

- Eaton clutches
- Eaton automated and mechanical transmissions
- Eaton hybrid power systems: mounted between the UltraShift automated manual transmission and clutch is an electric motor/generator, connected to a power inverter using lithium-ion batteries, controlled with an electronic control module. The system has a fail-safe that reverts to conventional engine-powered operation should some fault occur.
- Roadranger synthetic lubricants
- Eaton MD mobile diagnostics

The truck segment is involved in the design, manufacture and marketing of powertrain systems and other components for commercial vehicle markets. Key products include manual and automated transmissions, clutches, drive-line components, and hybrid power.

Eaton's automotive segment produces products such as superchargers, engine valves, valve train components, cylinder heads, locking and limited-slip differentials, heavy-duty drive-line components, fuel, emissions, and safety controls, transmission and engine controls, spoilers, exterior moldings, plastic components, and fluid connectors.

The eMobility sector combines elements of Eaton's electrical and vehicle businesses to deliver electric vehicles to passenger car, commercial vehicle and off-highway OEMs.

== Acquisitions and divestments ==
In one of Eaton's largest acquisitions, the company purchased the Westinghouse Distribution and Controls Business Unit in 1994. The acquisition included all of the Westinghouse electrical distribution and control product business and also included stipulations that the Westinghouse name cannot be used by anyone else on these types of products for years. Today, Eaton Electrical manufactures electrical distribution and control products branded "Eaton" or "Cutler-Hammer", which can replace Westinghouse products in commercial and industrial applications.

Eaton spun off its semiconductor manufacturing equipment business as Axcelis Technologies in 2000.

In 2003, Eaton's Electrical Distribution and Control business (formerly known as Cutler-Hammer) acquired the electrical division of Delta plc. This acquisition brought Delta's brands Holec, MEM, Tabula, Bill and Elek under the Eaton nameplate with the previous Westinghouse divisions and gave the company manufacturing facilities to meet IEC standards, one of the steps to become a global company and developing a worldwide standard.

Soon after this acquisition, Eaton entered a joint venture with Caterpillar Inc. and purchased 51% of I & S operations, now known as Intelligent Switchgear Organization, LLC. This was followed in 2004 by the acquisition of Powerware. The Powerware brand is known for the design and production of medium to large Uninterruptible Power System (UPS) devices. After several years of co-branding UPS products "Eaton|Powerware" the company is switching to the single brand Eaton for all UPS products including; BladeUPS, 9355, 9390, 9395, and 9E.

In 2006, Eaton entered the data center power distribution market. Initial products were internally developed PDU's and RPP's under the Powerware brand and included the PowerXpert metering system. A Powerware brand Static Transfer Switch was added to the portfolio through a brand-label relationship with Cyberex. To complete the power distribution portfolio Eaton released a line of rack power distribution products under its Powerware brand called ePDU. It acquired Aphel Technologies Ltd., a manufacturer of power distribution product for data centers based in Coventry, UK. Shortly after, it added Pulizzi Engineering Inc., a manufacturer of mission critical power distribution based in Santa Ana, California. In late 2007, it acquired the MGE Office Protection Systems division of Schneider Electric, as a result of Schneider's acquisition of APC. A Taiwanese manufacturer, Phoenixtec, was also acquired giving the company the highest share in the Chinese single-phase UPS market.

On 21 May 2012, Eaton announced that it had agreed to purchase Ireland-based Cooper Industries in a cash-and-stock deal valued at about $11.46 billion. The new company is called Eaton Corporation plc and is incorporated in Ireland. Then-Chairman and CEO of Eaton Alexander Cutler headed the new corporation. Cooper shareholders received $39.15 in cash and 0.77479 of a share in the newly created company for each Cooper share held. This is worth $72 per share based on Eaton's closing share price of $42.40 on 18 May 2012, and is 29% above Cooper's closing stock price. Eaton Corporation plc completed its acquisition of Cooper Industries on 30 Nov 2012. The $13 billion acquisition of Cooper (US$5.4B Sales revenue (2011)), became the largest in Eaton's (US$16B Sales Revenue (2011)) 101-year history.

On 17 Mar 2021, Eaton completed the acquisition of Tripp Lite for $1.65 billion. President and COO of Electrical Sector, Eaton Uday Yadav said "The acquisition of Tripp Lite will enhance the breadth of our edge computing and distributed IT product portfolio and expand our single-phase UPS business." The acquisition will further Eaton's access to the consumer market in which Tripp Lite has a strong position.

Eaton's hydraulics business, manufacturing systems and components for the agriculture, construction, mining, forestry, utility, material handling, machine tools, molding, power generation, primary metals, and oil and gas markets, was acquired by Danfoss in August 2021 for $3.3 billion.

== Headquarters ==
From 1920s-1964 Eaton was based on East 140th Street in Cleveland, Ohio. In 1964, the company moved its headquarters into the new Erieview Tower where it remained until 1983. In that year, Eaton Corporation moved into a 28-story Cleveland office tower which was renamed for it. Eaton relocated to its new 580,000 square foot facility, named Eaton Center, in Beachwood, Ohio in early 2013. They reincorporated, as a means of reducing its U.S. corporate tax burden, in Ireland as part of the Cooper merger involved establishing a registered head office in Dublin, Ireland but operational headquarters remain in Beachwood.

== Lawsuits and other issues ==
=== Racial harassment ===
In 1995, Eaton Corp had to pay $1.25M in restitution to a former employee who had been subject to racial harassment. Incidents included food being thrown on his desk, food being thrown through the roof of his car, use of the word "nigger", and the presence of neo-Nazi flyers at Eaton Corp.

In 2020, an employee sued Eaton Corp for retaliation and facilitating a climate of racial harassment. After a profane outburst from a fellow worker, the plaintiff was assigned to work and train under a supervisor who abused him psychologically. The supervisor made frequent use of "nigger", made reference to slavery and lynching, and claimed his job was to get rid of Black workers. The employee informed management of his hostile work environment, but management responded by disciplining the plaintiff himself.

=== Long-term benefits ===
Back when Eaton Corp was struggling with bankruptcy, various employees on long-term benefits suddenly found themselves terminated. Eaton had failed to insure the plan that the employees had nonetheless paid for. This led to numerous suits against Eaton.

=== Tax avoidance ===
In 2012, the acquisition of Cooper Industries made it possible for Eaton Corp to become an Irish company, which would sharply lower its corporate tax rate. The move was later denounced by both President Obama and President Donald Trump.

=== Triumph Group ===
In 2004, Eaton Corp sued Triumph Group for trade secrets theft, but when it was discovered that the company's lawyers were paying former Hinds County District Attorney Ed Peters to improperly influence Hinds County Circuit Judge Bobby DeLaughter, the defendants countersued. In 2014, Eaton Corp paid $135M to Triumph Group and $13M to six former employees to settle the long-running legal dispute. Judge DeLaughter was sentenced to 18 months in prison.

=== Software sabotage ===
In 2018, Eaton Corporation became the target of internal sabotage by a longtime software developer following a corporate restructuring. The employee, Davis Lu, embedded malicious code in the company’s Windows production environment, including a kill switch that would trigger if his account was disabled. When Lu was terminated in September 2019, the kill switch activated, locking out thousands of users and severely disrupting Eaton's global operations. The incident caused hundreds of thousands of dollars in damages. Lu was later convicted of intentionally damaging protected computers and, in 2025, was sentenced to four years in prison and three years of supervised release.

== Corporate recognition and rankings ==
Recognitions include the following:

- Ranked #4 in "100 Best Corporate Citizens" of Corporate Responsibility Magazine in 2013, also ranking in Top 50 for Six Consecutive Years.
- Named to Thomson Reuters Top 100 Innovators List, 2011 - 2012 - 2013.

== See also ==
- Cooper Industries
- Eagle Electric
- Powerware
- Corporation tax in the Republic of Ireland#Corporate tax inversions
