= Alexander M. Cutler =

Alexander Cutler
- Born: Milwaukee, Wisconsin
- Other names: Sandy Cutler
- Education: Yale University and Dartmouth College
- Occupations: Chairman and CEO, Eaton Corporation
- Years active: 2000-2016

Alexander 'Sandy' Cutler is the former chairman and chief executive officer of Eaton Corporation, retiring on May 31, 2016, after a 41-year career with the company. Prior to his appointment as chairman and CEO, Cutler served as Eaton's president and chief operating officer.

== Early life ==
Cutler was born in Milwaukee, Wisconsin, and attended the Loomis Chaffee School in Windsor, Connecticut. He received a Bachelor of Arts degree from Yale University and a Master of Business Administration from the Amos Tuck School of Business Administration at Dartmouth College.

== Career ==
Cutler served as the chairman and CEO of the Eaton Corporation.

Cutler initially worked for Cutler-Hammer, which was acquired by Eaton in 1979. Despite sharing the family name, Sandy Cutler was not related to Cutler-Hammer founder Harry T. Cutler.

As CEO of Eaton in 2009, Cutler earned a total of $6,803,863, including $973,248 in base salary, $575,000 in cash bonuses, $5,099,874 in stock granted, and $155,741 in other compensation. In 2016, Crain's Cleveland Business listed Cutler as one of the Top Paid CEOs.

He currently serves on the Boards of Directors of DuPont, KeyCorp, the Electrical Manufacturers Club, and the Musical Arts Association. He is a member of the Committee on Capital Markets Regulation.

== Philanthropy ==
He is a past member of the board of the Yale University Alumni Fund, the Yale University Development Board, the Amos Tuck School of Business Administration at Dartmouth College, and the Loomis Chaffee School. He has also served as president of the Yale Alumni Association of Cleveland. Additionally, he served on the executive committees of the Northeast Ohio Council on Higher Education (formerly the Cleveland Commission on Higher Education), the Visiting Committee of the Weatherhead School of Management at Case Western Reserve University, the Cleveland Play House, the Greater Cleveland Growth Association, and the Museum of Natural History. He is a past co-chairman of the Cleveland Commission on Economic Partnerships and Inclusion and the United Way Services of Greater Cleveland
