= Christopher Hipp =

Christopher G. Hipp (August 6, 1961 – July 14, 2009) was an American inventor and serial entrepreneur who received a patent for his invention of the blade server, a compact, stripped-down computer server that includes all of the necessary components to operate as a computer while taking up minimal space on a standard rack mount and minimizing power consumption.

Hipp was born in Houston. Raised in Dallas, he educated himself in the field of computers after he left college and pursued this avenue after seeing how technology would change the graphic design realm.

Until 2000, Hipp ran Digital Media Performance Labs, a Dallas-based company he founded in 1995 that served the technology needs of the graphics and video industry, selling the Silicon Graphics (SGI) line of high-performance computing workstations and software.

He established RLX Technologies in The Woodlands, Texas, near Houston, staffed primarily by former employees of Compaq. The company shipped the first blade server in 2000, a technology that allowed more computers to be packed into a smaller amount of space, with many using less power than comparable servers. IBM was an early investor and reseller of RLX's servers. A patent on what became known as the blade server was applied for on July 20, 2000, and the United States Patent and Trademark Office awarded patent number 6,411,506 for a "High density web server chassis system and method" on June 25, 2002, the first commercialized blade server architecture, to Hipp and David Kirkeby. Hewlett-Packard bought out RLX in October 2005, though Hipp stated that he had only earned $1 from the sale as his holdings had been diluted when stock was issued to venture capital firms to obtain the funding needed to get the business off the ground. By the time of his death, the blade server market had exceeded $5 billion in annual sales, much of it driven by efforts to cut energy costs.

Hipp focused on other ventures developing computer technology, most recently at D-Wave Systems, a start-up based in Burnaby, British Columbia, that announced a working prototype of quantum computer in 2007.

Mark Seager, Lawrence Livermore National Laboratory's head of advanced computing, described Hipp as a "visionary" looking to find "where the next industry innovation would come from and working... to make that happen".

== Personal ==
A resident of Redwood City, California, Hipp died at age 48 on July 14, 2009, while cycling in nearby Palo Alto, having collapsed during his ride. The cause of death was a cardiac arrhythmia. He was survived by his brother, as well as by Lorraine Sneed, his partner of 15 years, who she later said "got him" when she asked Hipp on their first date "if he wanted to come see my SGI".

Hipp was described as a "semiprofessional cyclist" and had won a number of races in the Southwest. While competing in the 2009 Tour de France, Lance Armstrong released a Tweet of condolence upon hearing of Hipp's death.
