= Cisco Unified Computing System =

Type of data center server computer

Cisco Unified Computing System (UCS) is a data center server computer product line composed of server hardware, virtualization support, switching fabric, and management software, introduced in 2009 by Cisco Systems. The products are marketed for scalability by integrating many components of a data center that can be managed as a single unit.

== Computing ==
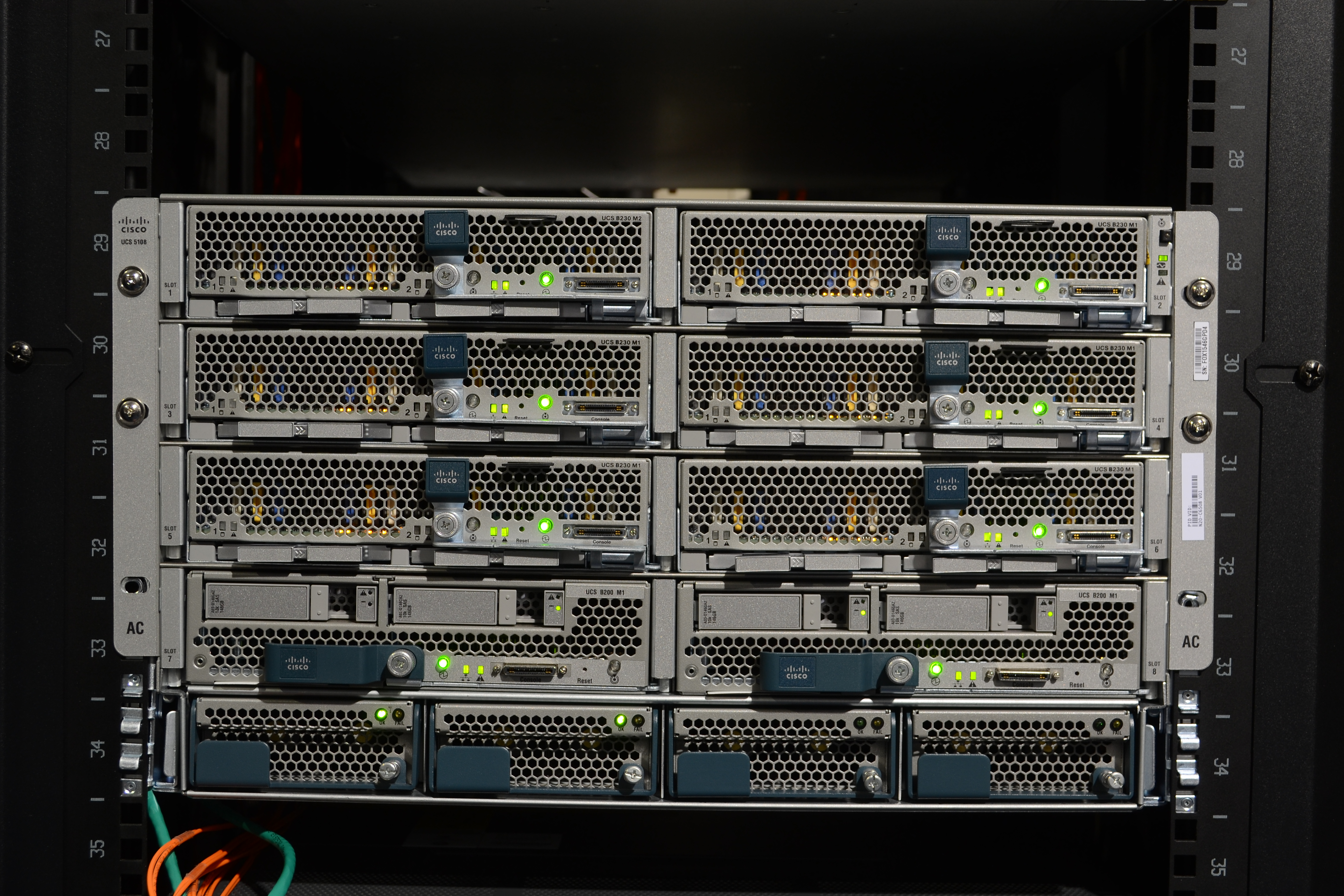
Cisco UCS blade servers

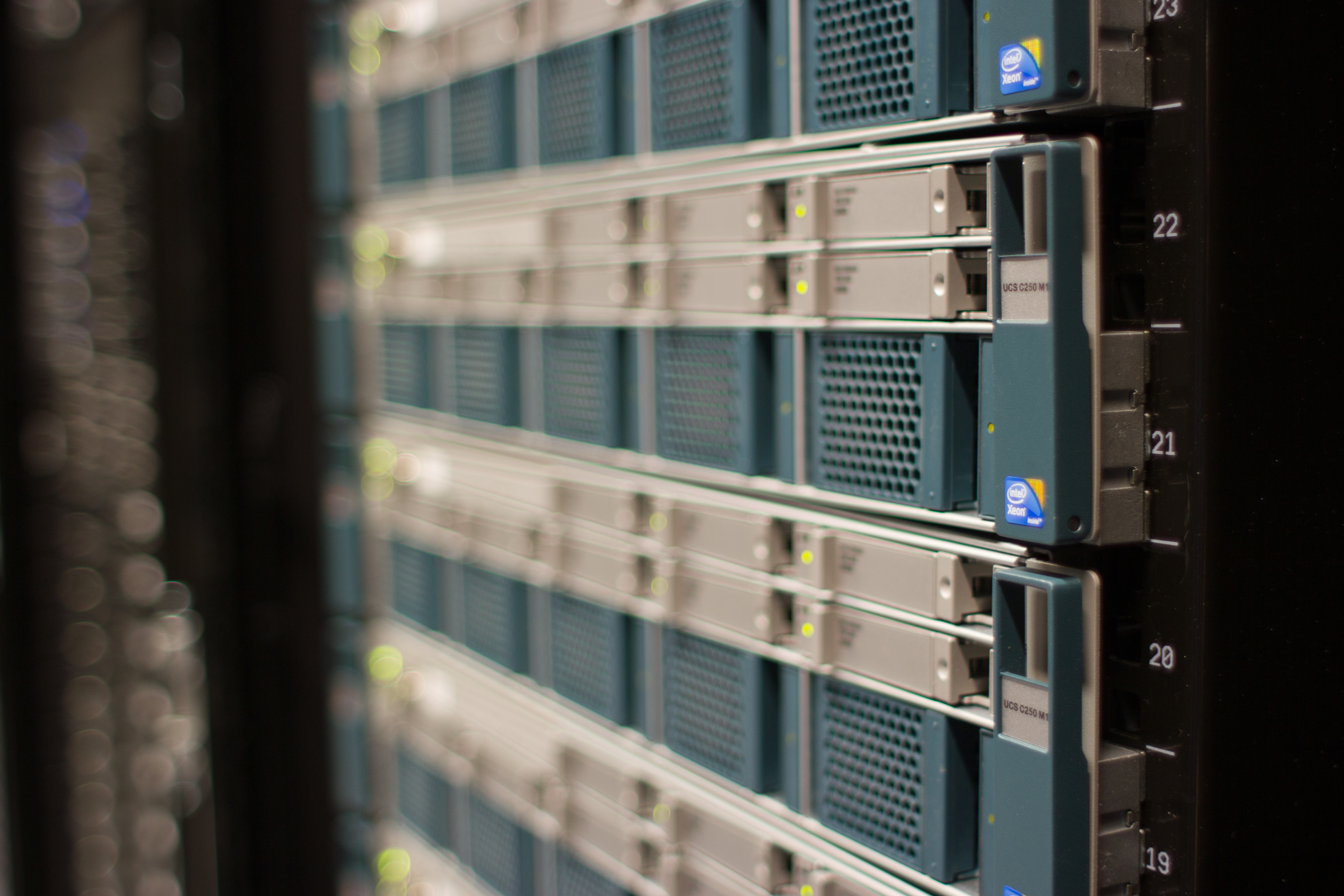
Cisco UCS C250 servers

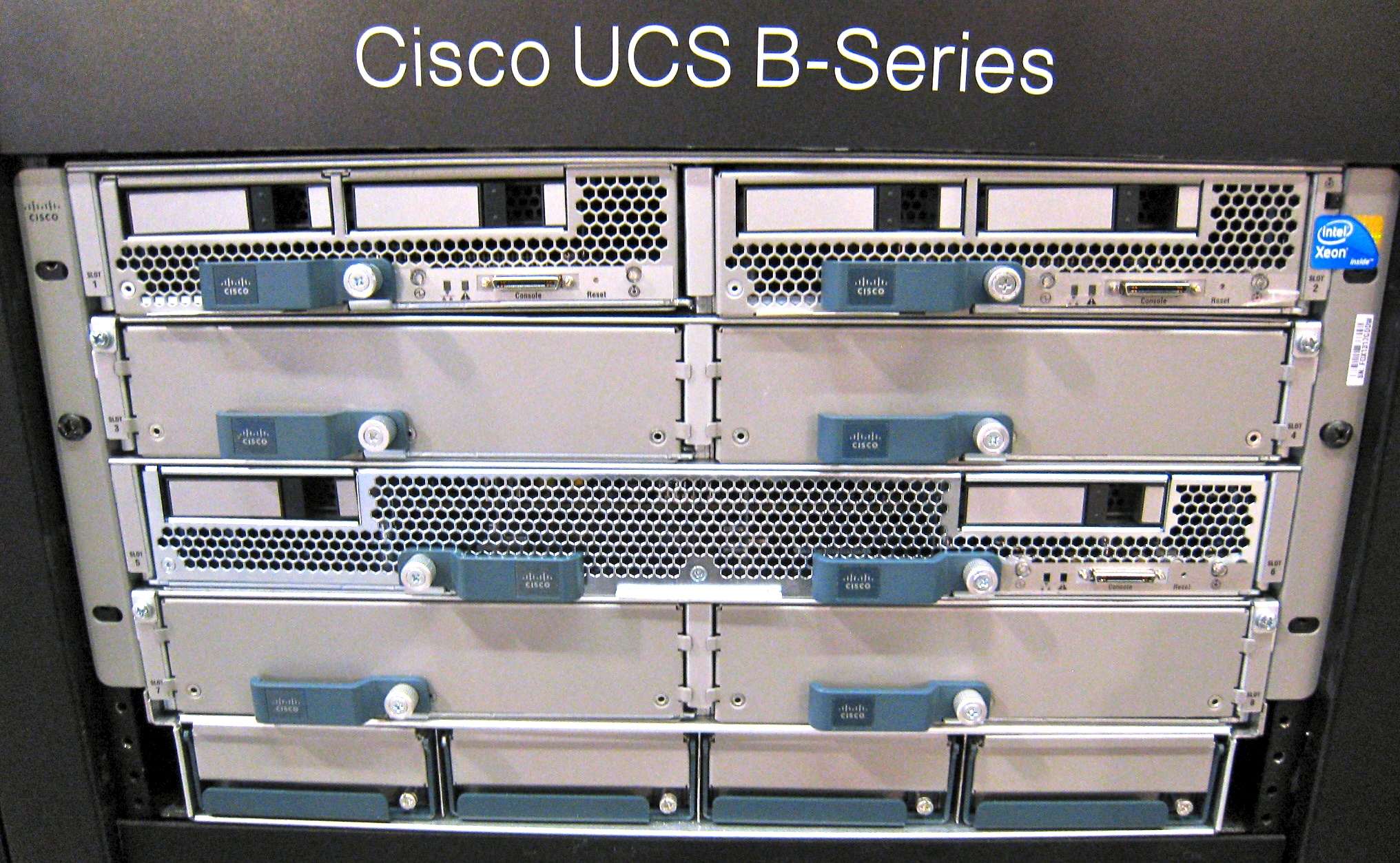

The UCS product line was announced in March and first installed in September 2009, at the customer premises of Tutor Perini. The first customer purchase of UCS was by Fiserv, a financial services customer in Milwaukee, Wisconsin. The entire project was code named "California".

The computing component of the UCS is available in two versions: the B-series (a powered chassis and full and/or half slot blade servers), and the C-series for 19-inch racks (that can be used with fabric interconnects). The computer hardware managed by the UCS Manager software on the fabric Interconnects can be any combination of the two. Both form factors use standard components, including Intel x86-64 processors and DIMM memory. The servers are marketed with converged network adapters and port virtualization.

Around 2010, an extended memory technology expanded the number of memory sockets that can be connected to a single memory channel in some models.

A fifth generation was announced in July 2018.

== Virtualization ==
Cisco UCS supports several hypervisors including VMware ESXi, Microsoft Hyper-V and Citrix Systems' Xen server. VMware provides a special version of ESXi.

In 2017 Cisco announced a partnership with Docker to include its enterprise software in UCS products to directly provide operating system-level virtualization (containerization).

== Networking ==
The Cisco fabric interconnects (FI) provide network connectivity for the chassis, blade servers and rack servers connected to it through different speeds of Ethernet and Fibre Channel over Ethernet (FCoE). The fabric interconnects are derived from the Nexus 5500 and 9300 series switch families and run NX-OS as well as UCS Manager software. FCoE allows connection to storage area network storage, To allow stateless compute in addition to local storage capacity. Cisco has produced the following series for fabric interconnects: 6100 Series (discontinued), 6200 Series (discontinued), 6300 Series, and 6400 Series. The fabric interconnect can further connect to multiple fabric extenders (FEX), into what they call a "unified fabric".

By 2012, analysts noticed that Fibre Channel vendors such as Brocade Communications Systems had already lost market share to Cisco.

== Management ==
Management of the system devices is handled by the UCS Manager software integrated with fabric interconnects. Virtual machines can be moved from one physical chassis to another, applications may be moved between virtual machines, and management may even be conducted remotely from an iPhone using SiMU - Simple iPhone Management of UCS. In addition to the embedded software, administrators may also manage the system from VMware's vSphere. The Cisco Integrated Management Controller (CIMC) is used to configure and manage C-Series servers not connected to a manager. The CIMC can also be used to manage B-series blades in addition to the UCS Manager application if configured.

In November 2012, Cisco announced UCS Central which extends management across multiple domains of UCS, and then something called UCS Director. A security flaw in UCS Central was disclosed when it was patched in 2016.

Many configuration details are set up on the UCS manager in a service profile and applied to the servers. Cisco offers a UCSM Platform Emulator, where the full logical configuration of a server can be created from the user interface or the API methods, and later applied to the physical hardware.

In 2017, Cisco announced a cloud-hosted management offering for UCS infrastructure called Cisco Intersight. This platform augmented the UCS management platform.
