= Powerware =

Eaton Corporation brand for power quality related products

- Industry: Electrical Products
- Parent: Eaton Corporation

Powerware is an Eaton Corporation brand (registered in some countries) for power quality related products such as uninterruptible power supplies (UPS) and surge protection, ranging from protection of single computers (PCs) to industrial power backup systems. The brand also includes DC products for IT and telecommunications applications ranging from small customer-premises equipment to the largest telephone exchanges and switching centers.

Eaton Corporation acquired the Powerware company from Invensys in 2004, and after fully integrating the workforce into its Power Quality Services division, has continued to use the Powerware brand.
