= PowerEdge =

Server computer platform

Dell PowerEdge

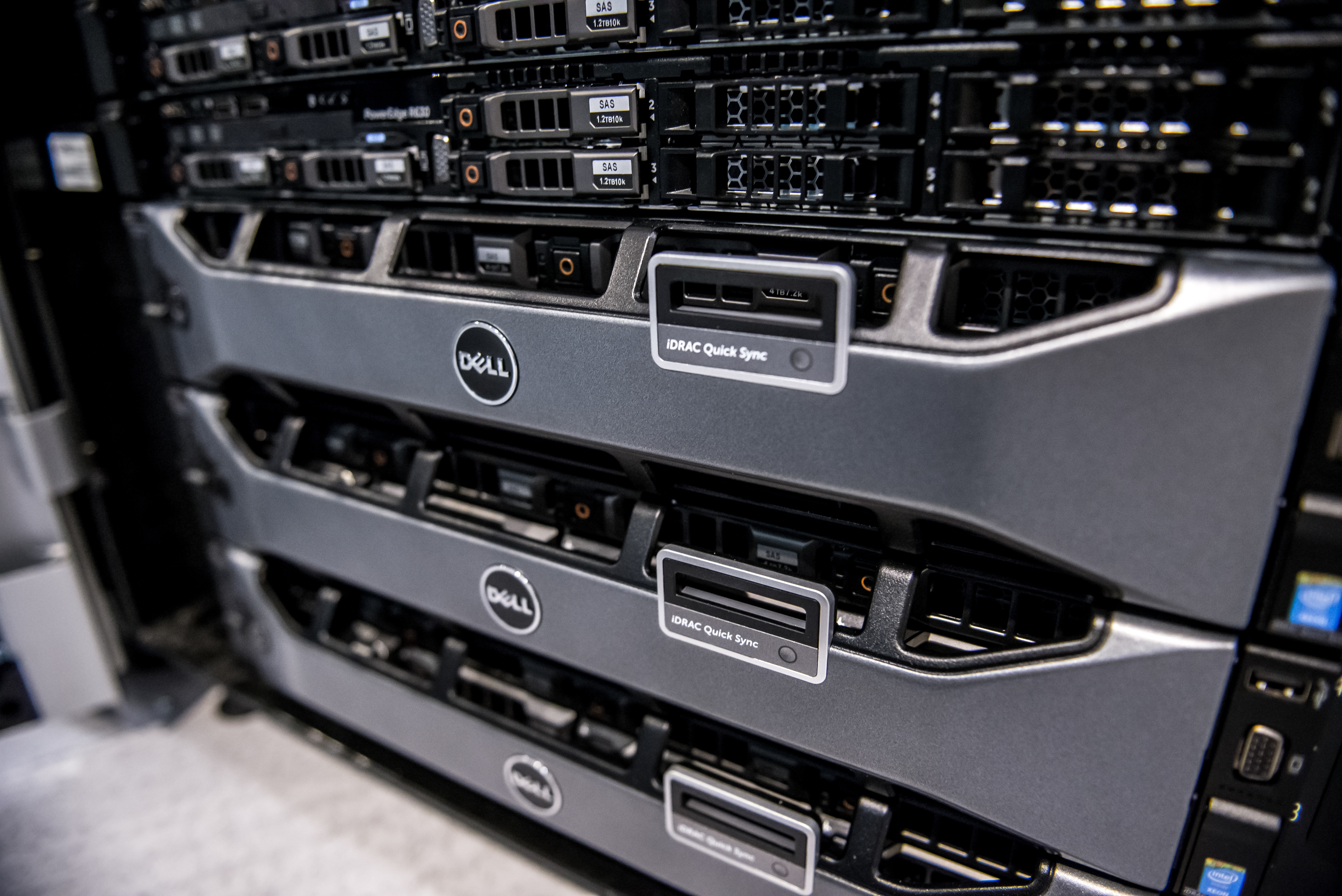
- Dell PowerEdge rackmount servers
- Developer: Dell
- Type: Server
- Released: 1994; 32 years ago
- Operating system: Windows Server; Linux
- CPU: x86 (1994–current); Itanium (circa 2005)
- Predecessor: PowerLine SE

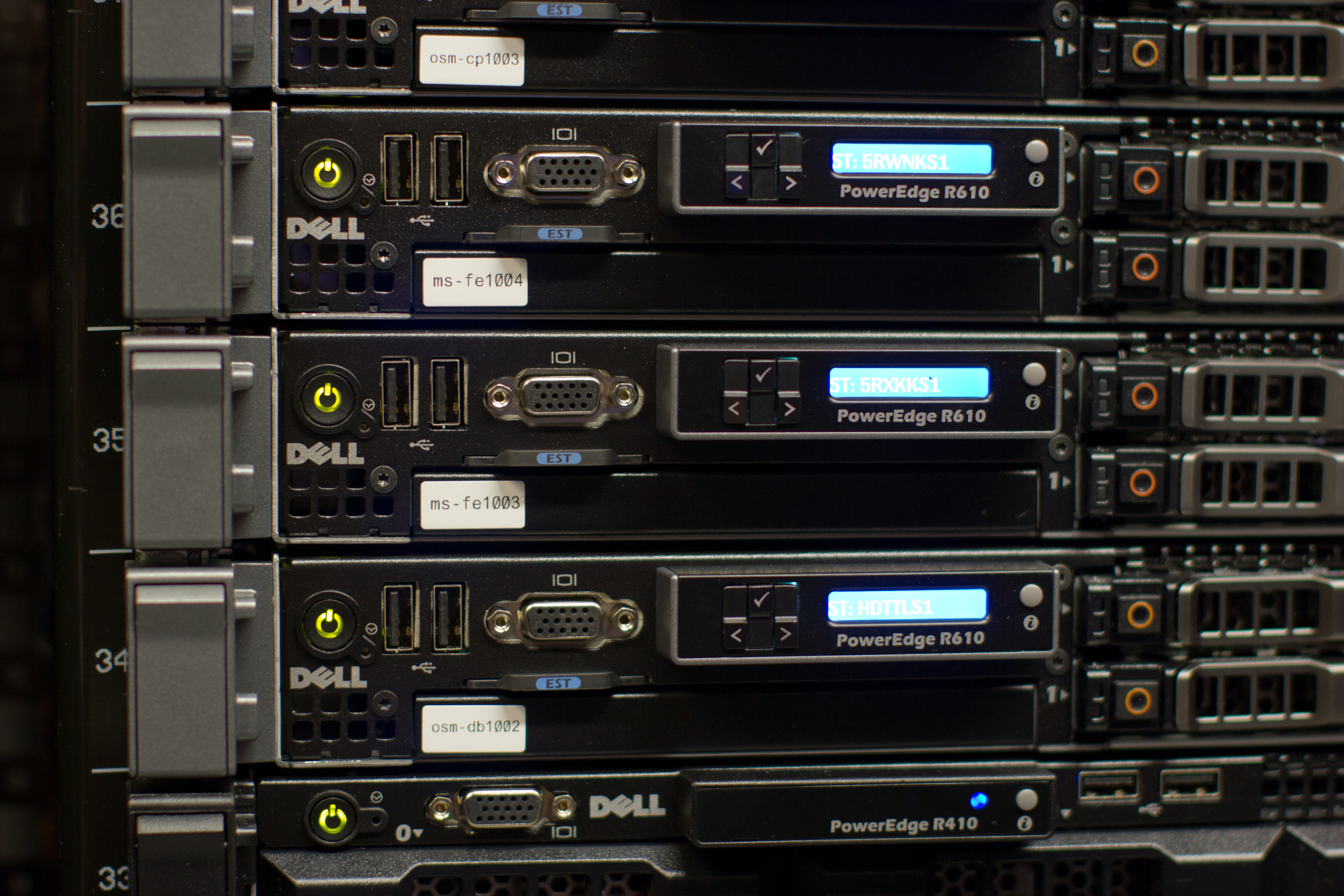
Rack-mounted 11th generation PowerEdge servers

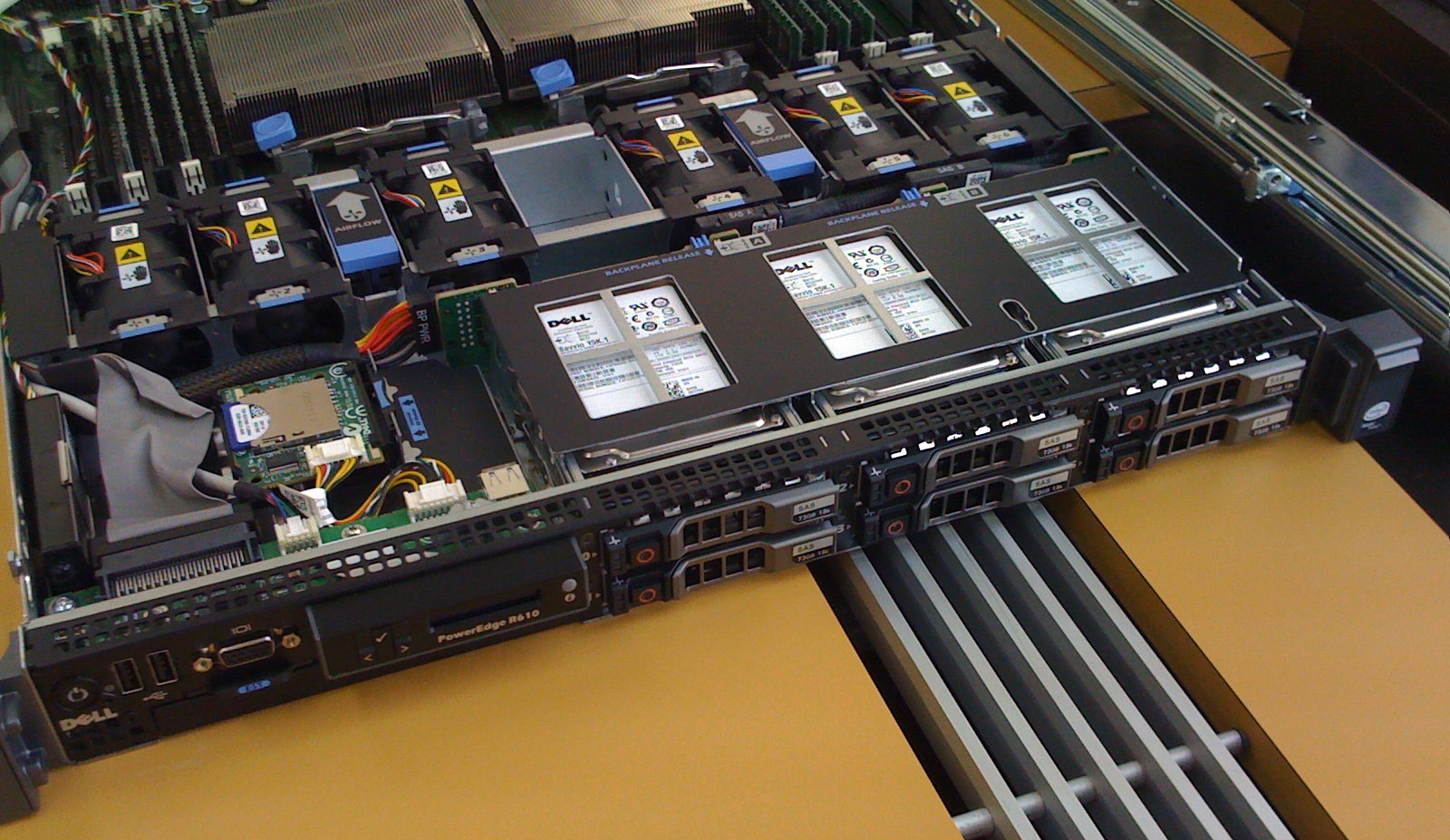
Rack-mountable 11th generation (11G) PowerEdge R610 server with the case opened and the front bezel removed

The PowerEdge (PE) line is Dell's server computer product line. PowerEdge machines come configured as tower, rack-mounted, or blade servers. Dell uses a consistent chip-set across servers in the same generation regardless of packaging, allowing for a common set of drivers and system-images. Dell groups servers that share common design components into numbered generations; as of 2026, the most recent is the 17th generation, introduced in 2024. Dell overtook Sun Microsystems in 2004 to become the third-largest server vendor by revenue, and by late 2025 it led the worldwide server market, largely because of demand for servers for artificial intelligence (AI) workloads.

Original equipment manufacturers (OEMs) and value-added resellers also offer solutions based on PowerEdge servers. Loaded with custom software and with minor cosmetic changes, Dell's servers form the underlying hardware in certain appliances from IronPort, Google,Exinda Networks, and Enterasys.

== History ==
The first PowerEdge systems were released in February 1994. The initial PowerEdge line comprised a range of 15 models, with the lowest-end entries powered by Intel's i486 processor and the highest-end entries powered by the newest Pentium processors. The PowerEdge replaced Dell's earlier PowerLine SE server range.

In April 1999 Dell announced that it would factory-install Red Hat Linux 6.0 on PowerEdge servers, beginning with the four-processor PowerEdge 6300, and became the first company to receive Red Hat's multiprocessor certification. Dell's first blade server, the PowerEdge 1655MC, was announced in April 2002 with up to six blades, each with two Pentium III processors, in a 3U enclosure, and began shipping in November 2002. Its successor, the PowerEdge 1855, launched in November 2004 with ten blades in a 7U chassis; The Register judged that IBM and HP still offered denser blade systems with more management features.

Most PowerEdge servers use the x86 architecture. The early exceptions to this, the PowerEdge 3250, PowerEdge 7150, and PowerEdge 7250, used Intel's Itanium processor, but Dell abandoned Itanium in 2005 after failing to find adoption in the marketplace. According to Gartner, Dell sold 1,371 Itanium servers in 2004, about 5% of the Itanium server market. The partnership between Intel and Dell remained close, with Intel remaining the exclusive source of processors in Dell's servers until 2006. In May 2006 Dell announced that it also intended to develop servers using AMD Opteron processors. The first Opteron-based PowerEdge systems, the PowerEdge 6950 and the PowerEdge SC1435, appeared in October 2006.

In 2007 the PowerEdge line accounted for approximately 15% of Dell's overall revenue from computer-hardware sales. In subsequent years Dell made the transition from a pure hardware vendor to a solutions-provider and services company, as evidenced, for example, by the acquisition of Perot Systems and KACE Networks and the setup of a special global services department within Dell.

Dell's Data Center Solutions unit began building custom, unbranded servers for large data-centre operators such as Facebook in 2007, years before the Open Compute Project, and grew into a business with more than $1 billion in sales. In March 2010 Dell began selling three of these designs as the PowerEdge C series: the C1100, the C2100 and the C6100, which held four two-socket server nodes in a 2U chassis. The C-series servers replaced iDRAC with a simpler baseboard management controller supporting IPMI 2.0, and at launch supported Linux, VMware ESXi and Citrix XenServer but not Windows. In May 2012 Dell announced Copper, a prototype ARM server with 48 servers based on Marvell's Armada XP processor in a 3U chassis, which it supplied as seed units to selected customers and developers rather than selling it commercially.

After Dell's merger with EMC Corporation, branding announced in May 2016 placed Dell's enterprise products under the Dell EMC name, and the 14th generation was launched as Dell EMC PowerEdge in 2017. By January 2023 the servers were again sold under the Dell PowerEdge name.

== Generations ==
Dell groups PowerEdge servers that share common design components into generations. Since the 10th generation, the generation has been shown by the second digit of the model number.

PowerEdge generations since the 2007 naming scheme
Generation	Introduced	Processors at introduction	Embedded management	Example models
10th	2007	Intel Xeon, AMD Opteron		R200, R900, T105, M600, M605
11th	2009	Intel Xeon 5500 series	iDRAC6	R610, R710, T610, M610, M710
12th	2012	Intel Xeon E5-2600 family	iDRAC7	R620, R720, R820, M620
13th	2014	Intel Xeon E5-2600 v3 family	iDRAC8	R630, R730, R730xd, T630, M630
14th	2017	Intel Xeon Scalable	iDRAC9	R640, R740, R740xd, R940, C6420
15th	2019 (AMD); 2021 (Intel)	AMD EPYC 7002 series (2019); 3rd generation Intel Xeon Scalable and AMD EPYC (2021)	iDRAC9	R6515, R7525, R650, R750, XE8545
16th	2022 (AMD); 2023 (Intel)	4th generation AMD EPYC, 4th generation Intel Xeon Scalable	iDRAC9	R6625, R7625, R660, R760, HS5610
17th	2024	Intel Xeon 6, 5th generation AMD EPYC	iDRAC10	R470, R670, R770, R6715, R7725

The 11th generation, introduced in March 2009, embedded Dell's Unified Server Configurator, powered by the Lifecycle Controller, to allow servers to be deployed and configured without external media. The 12th generation was announced in February 2012 with iDRAC7 and Lifecycle Controller 2.0. Its servers were designed to keep running at ambient temperatures of up to 45 °C (113 °F) under Dell's Fresh Air specification, and models such as the R720 offered hot-pluggable, front-accessible Express Flash PCIe solid-state drives and Select Network Adapter daughter cards that provided onboard networking without using a PCIe slot. The 13th generation, launched in September 2014, added NVMe Express Flash storage options and iDRAC Quick Sync, which used near-field communication to pass server information to a smartphone or tablet.

The 14th generation was launched by Dell EMC in July 2017. It used Intel Xeon Scalable processors, supported more NVMe drives than the previous generation, and introduced iDRAC9 and the OpenManage Enterprise console; Dell EMC described its security design as built on a silicon-based root of trust, with signed firmware and automatic BIOS recovery.

From the 15th generation, AMD-based and Intel-based models were introduced at different times. AMD-based 15th-generation models such as the single-socket R6515 and R7515 were released in September 2019, and Intel-based models followed in March 2021, when Dell announced 17 servers with PCIe 4.0 support, including the ruggedized XR11 and XR12 for edge deployments. The 16th generation began with AMD EPYC servers announced in November 2022 that supported DDR5 memory and PCIe 5.0, followed in January 2023 by Intel-based models that introduced Smart Flow, a chassis design intended to increase airflow and reduce fan power. The 17th generation began in May 2024 with Intel Xeon 6 versions of the R670 and R770 for cloud service providers, followed by AMD EPYC models in October 2024, and introduced iDRAC10.

== Market position ==
Dell's server revenue grew in the early 2000s with demand for x86 servers. According to Gartner, Dell overtook Sun Microsystems in the third quarter of 2004 to become the third-largest server vendor by revenue, with 9.8% of the market, behind IBM and HP. IDC figures for the second quarter of 2007 placed Dell fourth, behind IBM, HP and Sun, with 11.6% of worldwide server revenue. At the Dell World conference in December 2012, Michael Dell said that Dell led the server market by shipments in North America and Asia, was 64,000 machines behind HP worldwide, and was on a path to become the worldwide leader within a few quarters.

Demand for servers for AI changed Dell's position in the 2020s. IDC ranked Dell first among server vendors by revenue in the third quarter of 2025, with 8.3% of a $112.4 billion market, and again in the fourth quarter of 2025, with $12.6 billion in revenue and 10.0% of the market, in a year when worldwide server revenue reached a record $444.1 billion. In its 2026 fiscal year, Dell reported more than $64 billion in orders for AI-optimized servers, more than $25 billion in shipments and a record backlog of $43 billion; AI-optimized servers accounted for $9.0 billion of revenue in the fourth quarter alone. For the second quarter of its 2027 fiscal year, reported in September 2026, Dell reported AI orders of $60.9 billion, AI server revenue of $16.4 billion and a backlog of $95 billion, and raised its full-year forecast for AI server revenue to $74 billion.

== Notable deployments ==
Several supercomputers at the Texas Advanced Computing Center (TACC) have been built from PowerEdge servers. Stampede, built from PowerEdge C8220 servers with Xeon E5 processors and Xeon Phi coprocessors, debuted at seventh place on the November 2012 TOP500 list with about 2.7 petaflops. Frontera, built from Dell C6420 servers with Xeon Platinum 8280 processors, ranked fifth on the June 2019 list with 23.5 petaflops and was described as the fastest university supercomputer in the world. Horizon, announced in November 2025 and built from liquid-cooled PowerEdge servers with Nvidia Grace Blackwell and Vera processors, was described by TACC as the largest academic supercomputer in the United States and was planned to enter production in spring 2026.

Dell expanded its XE range with servers using Nvidia H100 GPUs in November 2022, and has since supplied servers for large AI computing clusters. In June 2024 Michael Dell said the company was building an "AI factory" with Nvidia to power Grok for xAI, and Elon Musk said that Dell was assembling half of the racks for xAI's supercomputer, with Supermicro building the rest. In December 2024 Dell said it was the first to ship PowerEdge XE9712 servers with Nvidia's GB200 NVL72 platform, supplied to CoreWeave in liquid-cooled IR7000 racks.

== Security and export controls ==
In late 2013, documents published from the National Security Agency's ANT catalog described DEITYBOUNCE, an implant that exploited the motherboard BIOS and System Management Mode of PowerEdge 1850, 2850, 1950 and 2950 servers to keep software running on them. According to the catalog, it was installed by reflashing the BIOS remotely or by intercepting shipments. Dell's chief security officer, John McClurg, said that Dell did not work with any government to compromise its products and rejected the use of software implants and backdoors.

Vulnerabilities have also been found in the iDRAC management controller. In 2018 Dell EMC disclosed CVE-2018-1207, a critical flaw in iDRAC7 and iDRAC8 firmware before version 2.52.52.52 that could allow an unauthenticated remote attacker to run code through CGI variables; it was one of several issues reported by Immunity Inc. In 2020 Dell fixed CVE-2020-5366, a path traversal flaw in iDRAC9 found by researchers at Positive Technologies, which allowed an authenticated user with low privileges to read arbitrary files.

In April 2024 Reuters reported that tender documents showed Chinese entities had acquired Nvidia chips restricted by United States export controls inside servers made by Dell, Supermicro and Gigabyte after the controls were expanded in November 2023; Dell said it had found no evidence of shipping servers with the restricted chips to the entities named. In 2025 and 2026, prosecutors in Singapore charged several people with fraud for allegedly misrepresenting to Dell and Supermicro the end users of servers that, according to Singapore officials, might contain Nvidia chips.

== PowerEdge RAID Controller ==
Dell uses the name PowerEdge RAID Controller (PERC) for proprietary versions of its RAID computer storage controllers. The related software in the PERC Fault Management Suite offered facilities such as the Background Patrol read, which aims to fix bad sectors on online RAID disks running under some of the PERC controllers around 2006. These cards were equipped with hardware from LSI Corporation or Intel, 256 MBytes of memory (upgradeable on the 5/i to 512 MB), support up to 8x SATA 3.0 Gbit/s drives without the use of expanders. They had an optional Battery Backup Unit (BBU) to allow more flexible use of the memory during writes, enhancing performance in RAID5 and 6, and operate over the PCI Express interface.

In early 2010 Dell confirmed that the PERC H700 and H800 controllers for its 11th-generation servers would only operate with hard drives that Dell had qualified; earlier PERC controllers had only displayed warnings for other drives. Dell said that limiting support to qualified drives was standard in enterprise storage and was intended to protect data integrity.

== Chassis systems ==
Although PowerEdge is mainly used to refer to servers there are a few systems where the term PowerEdge refers to systems of which servers are (just) a part. Examples of these usages are:

PowerEdge M1000e – the Dell blade-server system where the complete system uses the term PowerEdge, and M1000e refers to the chassis and the complete combination of components in them. The individual non-server components have also their own name in their 'own' family such as PowerConnect M-switches or EqualLogic blade-SAN. Introduced in January 2008, the 10U enclosure holds up to 16 half-height blade servers.
PowerEdge VRTX – the converged system consisting of (up to) 4 PowerEdge M-blade servers, the built-in storage solution and the I/O networking module. It was announced in June 2013.
PowerEdge FX2 – a 2U converged enclosure announced in November 2014, in which server, storage and networking modules are installed as sleds that share power and cooling; for example, it can hold four FC630 or eight FC430 servers.
PowerEdge MX7000 – a 7U modular chassis announced in August 2018, with eight bays for single- and double-width compute and storage sleds such as the MX740c and MX840c compute sleds. It has no midplane, so the compute sleds connect directly to the I/O modules.

== Model naming convention ==
Since the introduction of the generation 10 servers in 2007 Dell adopted a standardized method for naming their servers; the name of each server is represented by a letter followed by 3 digits. The letter indicates the type of server: R (for Rack-mountable) indicates a 19" rack-mountable server, M (for Modular) indicates a blade server, while T (for Tower) indicates a stand-alone server.

This letter is then followed by 3 digits:

- The first digit refers to the number of CPU sockets in the system: 1 to 3 for one socket, 4 to 7 for two sockets, and 9 for four sockets. 8 can be either two or four sockets depending on generation and CPU maker
- The second digit refers to the generation: 0 for Generation 10, 1 for Generation 11, and so on.
- The third digit indicates the maker of the CPU: 0 for Intel or 5 for Advanced Micro Devices (AMD).

For example: The Dell PowerEdge M610 was a modular two-socket server of the 11th generation using an Intel CPU while the R605 was a rack-mountable two-socket AMD-based rack-server of the 10th generation.

Some AMD-based models have a fourth digit; for example, the 15th-generation R6515 and R7515 are single-socket servers, while the R6525 and R7525 have two sockets. The socket rule for the first digit has not been applied consistently in later generations: the 17th-generation R470 and R570 are single-socket servers. Later generations also added other prefixes, including C for dense multi-node servers such as the four-node C6525, MX for compute sleds of the MX7000 modular chassis, XE for servers designed for AI and accelerator-heavy workloads such as the XE8545, XR for ruggedized edge servers such as the XR11 and XR12, and HS for servers aimed at cloud service providers.

Prior to the Generation 10 servers, the naming convention was as follows:

- First digit – Height of the server in rack units
- Second digit – Generation of server (up to 9th generation)
- Third digit – Server type (5 for rack server, 0 for tower server, although tower servers could be outfitted with a rack chassis)
- Fourth digit – Indicated whether blade or independent box (5 for blade, 0 for normal independent box)

Example 1: PowerEdge 2650 ( 2 = 2U server, 6 = 6th generation, 5 = rack server, 0 = normal )

Example 2: PowerEdge 6950 ( 6 = 4U server, 9 = 9th generation, 5 = rack server, 0 = normal )

Example 3: PowerEdge 2800 ( 2 = [based on] 2U server 2850, 8 = 8th generation, 0 = tower server, 0 = normal )

Example 4: PowerEdge 1855 ( 1 = 1U server, 8 = 8th generation, 5 = rack server, 5 = blade )

Most servers had a tower equivalent. For example, the PowerEdge 2800 was the tower equivalent of the 2850. The naming applies to the tower version too, but the tower version will usually be between 5U and 6U.

== See also ==
- List of PowerEdge Servers
