= Heated glass =

Heating using transparent, electrically conductive coating on glass

Heated glass is a resistance heater created when a transparent, electrically conductive coating is applied to float glass and then subjected to an electric current. The electric current in the coating creates heat energy, which warms the glass until the glass radiates heat.

== Design ==
The manufacturing process begins with the application of a microscopic Tin dioxide coating to a pane of float glass. This coating is transparent and conducts electricity. Then, two busbars are applied to the glass as follows: the busbars must be parallel and applied to opposing edges on the same side of the glass pane. The surface of the glass between the busbars must be flat.

An electric current flows across the tin(II) oxide coating from one busbar to the other. The electrical resistance of the coating produces heat energy, which radiates from the glass. The busbars are connected to a power control unit that regulates the flow of electricity and thus the temperature of the glass. In modern architectural projects the heated glass is completely translucent. This technology uses a special metallic coating on the surface of the glass invisible to the naked human eye.

A pane of heated glass can achieve temperatures up to 350 degrees Fahrenheit (177 degrees Celsius). The standard desirable temperature range in buildings is between 104 and 113 degrees Fahrenheit (40 to 44 degrees Celsius). For industrial purposes higher temperatures may be warranted.

== Use ==
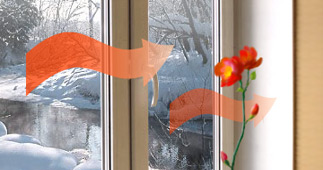
Heatable glass unit at work

The first heated glass was created in 1931 by Protes Glass Company, offered for cars. Their product was not a success.

Heated glass was first used on a wide scale in World War II in Naval Ships and on to aircraft windshields from frosting over in cold weather It is still used in both for this purpose.

Heated glass has been used in architectural applications for the past 30 years to prevent condensation and provide radiant heat. Condensation in buildings can have serious consequences to health and property values. Heated or radiant glass is generally an enhanced standard two pane insulated glass window using various bus bar technologies to convey the electric current to heat the glass. Some technologies are patented and permit larger glass areas to be heated than others. In

One university study shows that this heated glass technology is more efficient than other electric heating and can be more efficient than natural gas heating. Some environmentalists dispute the idea that this is an efficient heating system because even high e-value windows are poor insulators compared to insulated walls, and they believe heating window ejects much of the radiant heat outside. Another criticism is that this type of heating may encourage the use of larger windows in a house, making them less energy efficient. This technology has evolved since the late 1950s where it firstly evolved to be used for melting snow on glass roofs and was then effectively inverted and used as the heat source inside the building.

A common commercial use of heated glass is to prevent frost from forming on the glass doors of supermarket freezers. In addition, display cases (such as in convenience stores and delis) use heated glass shelves to keep cooked food items from cooling.

== See also ==
- Smart glass
- Window film
- Window § Solar window
