= Bus duct =

Low resistance electrical conductor for high current transmission and distribution

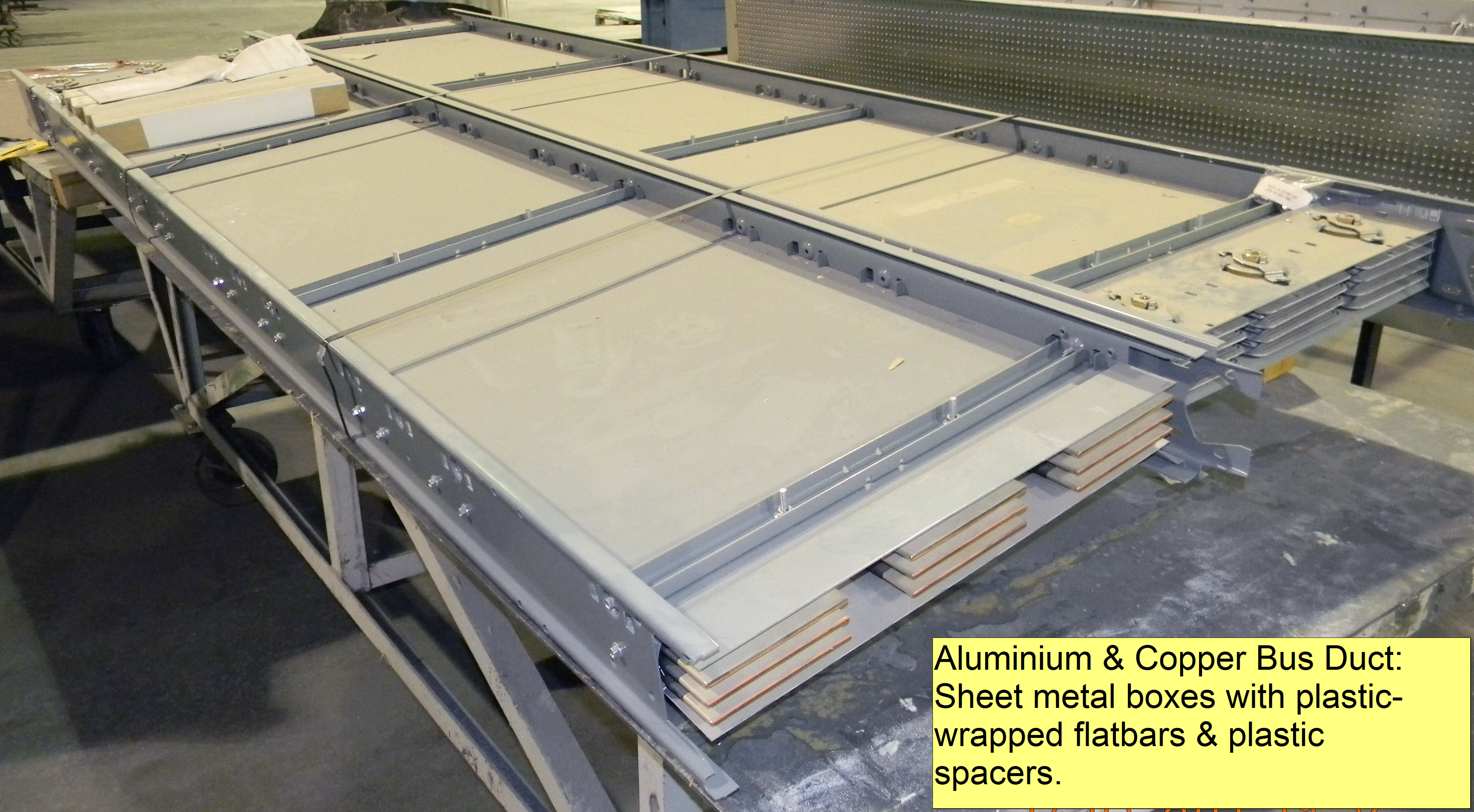
5000 ampere copper and 4000 A aluminium bus ducts

In electric power distribution, a bus duct (also called busway) typically uses sheet metal, welded metal or cast resin to contain and isolate copper or aluminium busbars for the purpose of conducting a substantial current of electricity. It is an alternative means of conducting electricity to power cables or cable bus.

Originally a busway consisted of bare copper conductors supported on inorganic insulators, such as porcelain, mounted within a non-ventilated steel housing.

== History ==
Busways were produced due to request of the automotive industry in Detroit in the late 1920s. Since that time, busways improved and became an integrated part of secondary network for industrial plants.

== Construction ==
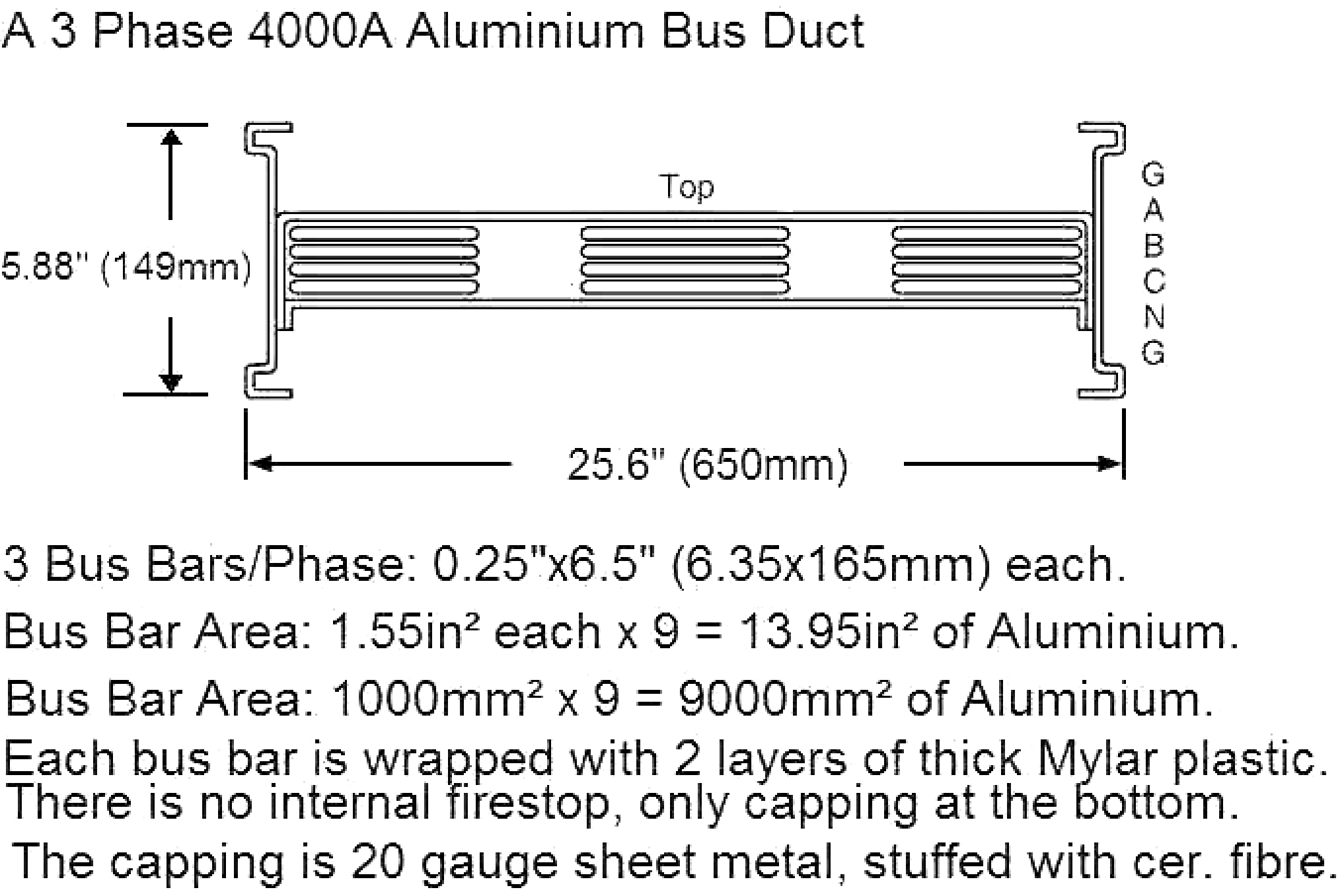
Section of aluminium bus duct with sandwiched bus bars

Innards of bus duct showing plastic wrappings of sandwiched busbars and hollow plastic tube spacers.

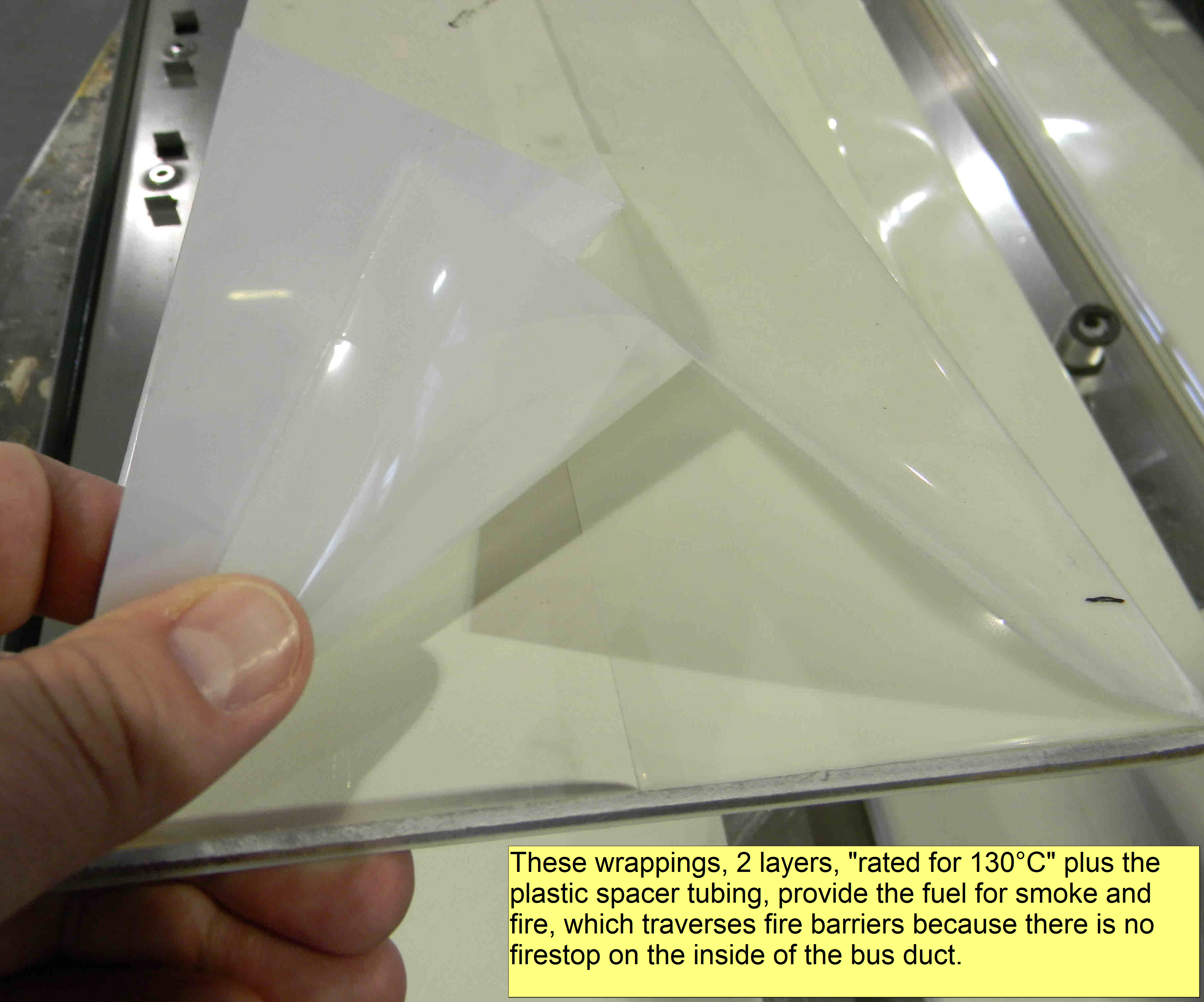
Individual busbar wrapping

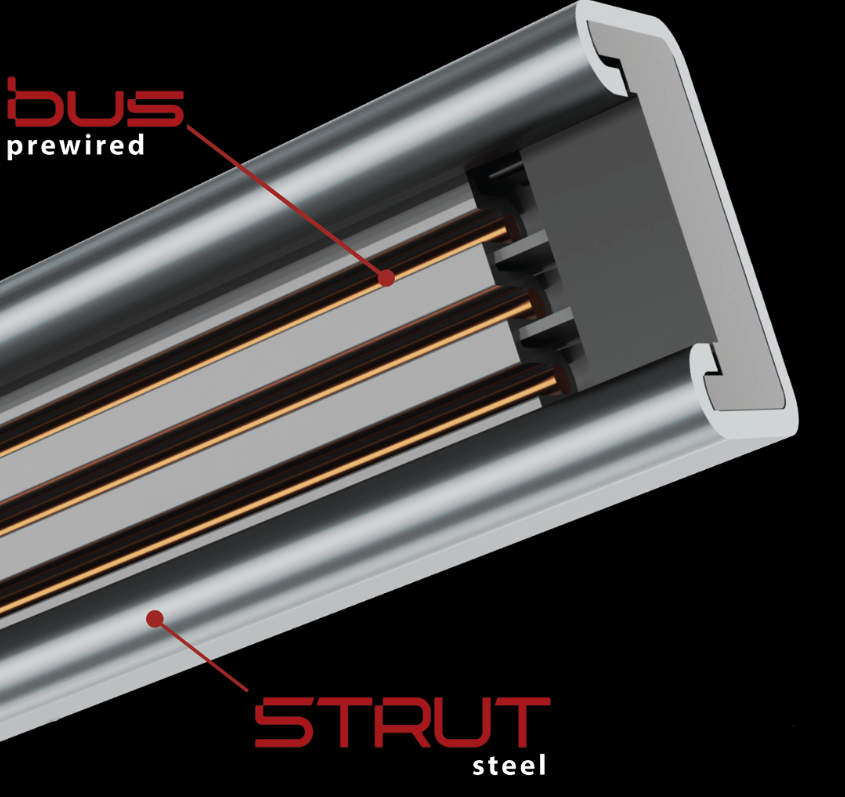
Bus duct, also called busway, is available with (3) finger-safe #8AWG copper wires in steel housing.

Some bus ducts are rectangular similar to cable tray, but have thicker, cold-formed steel side rails and thinner sheet metal coverings. Others can be circular. Busbars inside may be separated with distinct and even gaps between them, or “sandwiched” together.

Typically, individual busbars are wrapped or coated with a non-conducting, covalent material, such as plastic or (in older systems) electrical tape.

The structural integrity and electrical efficiency of these interleaved busbars depend heavily on the precision of cutting, punching, and bending processes. Advanced CNC busbar processing technology is increasingly utilized to ensure that connection points are perfectly aligned, thereby minimizing power loss and preventing overheating.

At the connection point, busbars flare out to enable connection to the next segment.

A plug-in bus duct system or busway can have disconnect switches and other devices mounted on it, for example, to distribute power along a long building. Many forms of busway allow plug-in devices such as switches and motor starters to be easily moved; this provides flexibility for changes on an assembly line, for example. In addition to powering floor fixtures, busways can provide power to plug-in light fixtures and even IoT devices.

Feeder busway is used to interconnect equipment, such as between a transformer and a switchgear line up. A variant type is a low-impedance busway, which is designed to have lower voltage drop by virtue of close spacing of bus bars, which reduces inductive reactance.

A trolley busway provides power to equipment that must be frequently moved. The busway is open at the bottom, and a movable collector assembly "trolley" is used to connect between the fixed bus bars in the busway and the cable connected to moving equipment. Bus ducts are building service penetrants that are required to be externally firestopped where they penetrate fire separations required to have a fire-resistance rating.

== See also ==
- Bus (computing)
- Busbar
- Isolated-phase bus
- Duct (flow)
