= Busbar =

Strip inside switchgear for local high current distribution

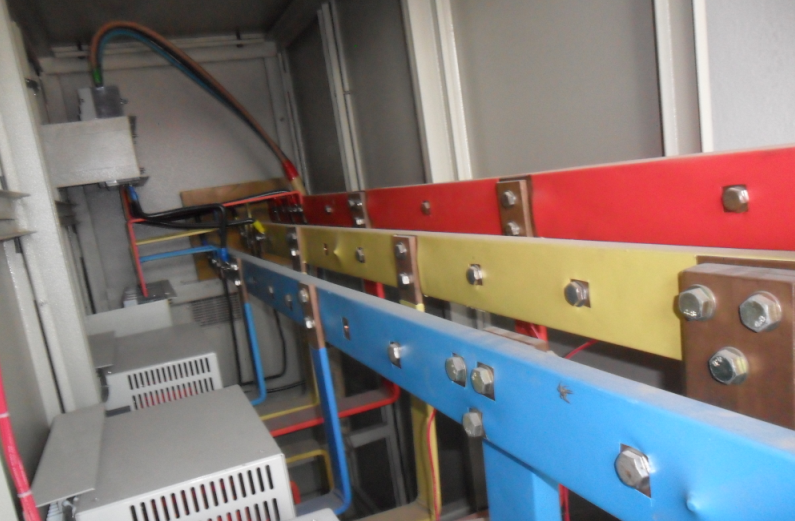
Copper busbar in a panel

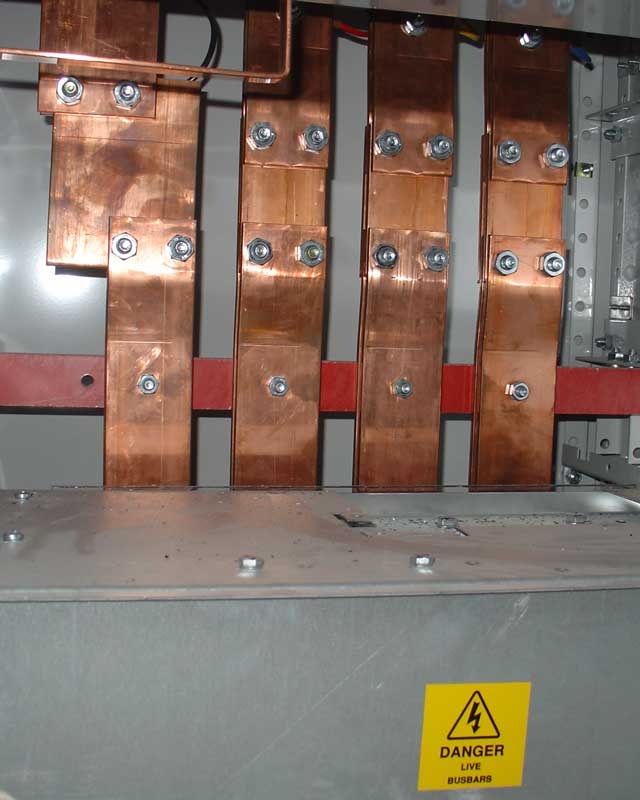
1500 ampere copper busbars within a power distribution rack for a large building

In electric power distribution, a busbar (also bus bar) is a metallic strip or bar, typically housed inside switchgear, panel boards, and busway enclosures for local high current power distribution, transmission, or switching substations. They are also used to connect high voltage equipment at electrical switchyards, and low-voltage equipment in battery banks. They are generally uninsulated, and have sufficient stiffness to be supported in air by insulated pillars. Those features allow sufficient cooling of the conductors, and the ability to tap in at various points without having to create a new joint.

== Design and placement ==
The busbar's material composition and cross-sectional size determine the maximum current it can safely carry. Busbars can have a cross-sectional area of as little as 10 square millimetres (0.016 sq in), but electrical substations may use metal tubes 50 millimetres (2.0 in) in diameter or more as busbars. Aluminium smelters use very large busbars to carry tens of thousands of amperes to the electrochemical cells that produce aluminium from molten salts.

Busbars are produced in a variety of shapes, including flat strips, solid bars and rods, and are typically composed of copper, brass or aluminium as solid or hollow tubes. Some of these shapes allow heat to dissipate more efficiently due to their high surface area to cross-sectional area ratio. The skin effect makes 50–60 Hz AC busbars more than about 8 millimetres (0.31 in) thickness inefficient, so hollow or flat shapes are prevalent in higher-current applications. A hollow section also has higher stiffness than a solid rod of equivalent current-carrying capacity, which allows a greater span between busbar supports in outdoor electrical switchyards.

A busbar must be sufficiently rigid to support its own weight, and forces imposed by mechanical vibration and possibly earthquakes, as well as accumulated precipitation in outdoor exposures. In addition, thermal expansion from temperature changes induced by ohmic heating and ambient temperature variations, and magnetic forces induced by large currents, must be considered. To address these concerns, flexible bus bars, typically a sandwich of thin conductor layers, were developed. They require a structural frame or cabinet for their installation. Mechanical forces generated by fault currents, which can momentarily reach hundreds of thousands of amperes, must also be considered.

Distribution boards split the electrical supply into separate circuits at one location. Busways, or bus ducts, are long busbars with protective covers. Rather than branching from the main supply at one location, they allow new circuits to branch off anywhere along the busway.

A busbar may be either supported on insulators, or wrapped in insulation. They are protected from accidental contact either by a metal earthed enclosure or by elevation out of normal reach. Insulated bus bars are used in busways listed to UL 857 standards. Power neutral busbars may also be insulated because it is not guaranteed that the potential between power neutral and safety grounding is always zero. Earthing (safety grounding) busbars are typically bare and bolted directly onto any metal chassis of their enclosure. They may be enclosed in a metal housing, in the form of a bus duct or busway, segregated-phase bus, or isolated-phase bus.

Busbars may be connected to each other and to electrical apparatus by bolting, clamping or welding. Joints between high-current bus sections often have precisely machined matching surfaces that are silver-plated to reduce contact resistance. At extra high voltages (more than 300 kV) in outdoor buses, corona discharge around the connections becomes a source of radio-frequency interference and power loss, so special connection fittings designed for those voltages are used.

110 kV busbars in electrical substations

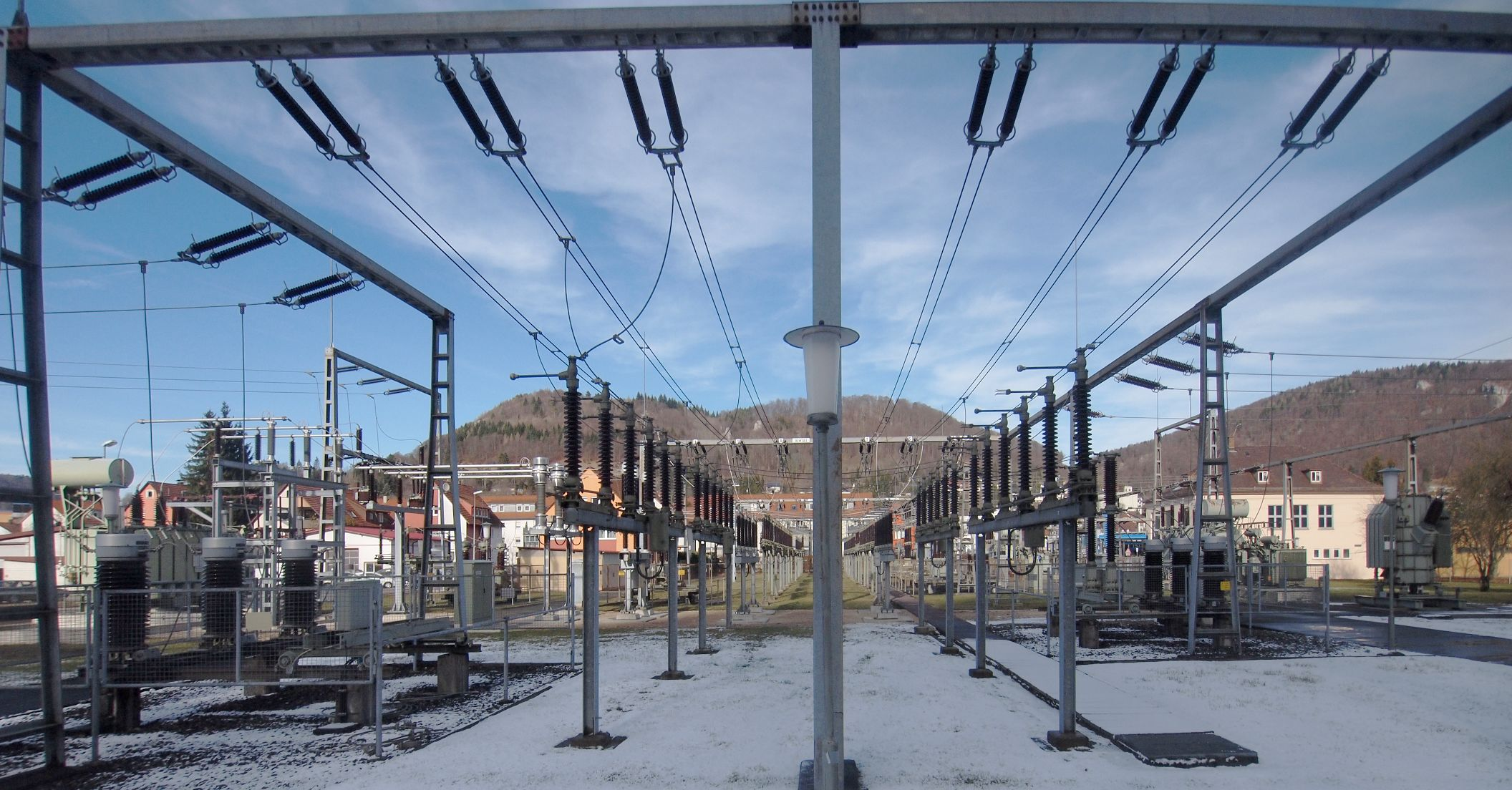
flexible busbar

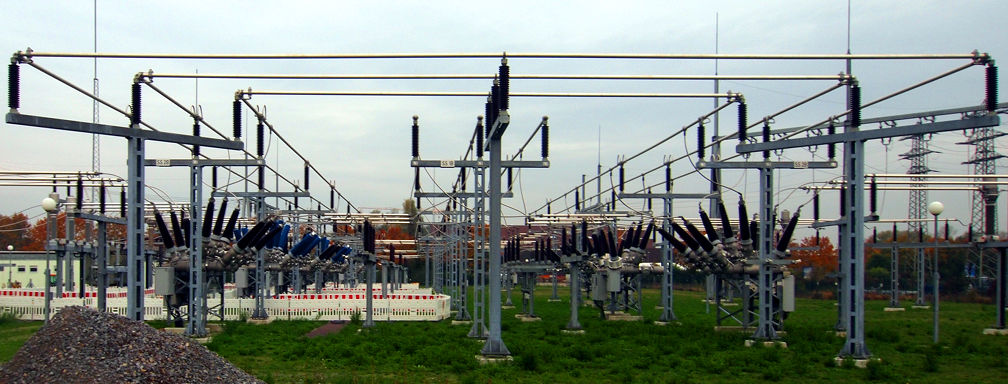
rigid busbar

== See also ==
- Bus (computing) – Data transfer channel connecting parts of a computer
- Bus duct – Low resistance electrical conductor for high current transmission and distribution
- Electrical busbar system – Modular approach to electrical wiring
- Jumper (computing) – Short length of conductor
- Wire bridge – Short length of conductor
