= N+1 redundancy =

Form of resilience with independent backup components

Redundancy is a form of resilience that ensures system availability in the event of component failure. Components (N) have at least one independent backup component (+1). The level of resilience is referred to as active/passive or standby as backup components do not actively participate within the system during normal operation. The level of transparency (disruption to system availability) during failover is dependent on a specific solution, though degradation to system resilience will occur during failover.

It is also possible to have N+1 redundancy with active-active components, in such cases the backup component will remain active in the operation even if all other components are fully functional, however the system will be able to perform in the event that one component is faulted and recover from a single component failure.

== Examples of N+1 redundancy ==
=== N+1 redundancy ===
- Connecting devices (server etc.) in dual switch storage area network (SAN) fabrics employ a discrete path to each switch. Only one path is active at any given time, resiliency is provided by the availability of an additional path if the active path becomes unavailable.
- Data centre power generators that activate when the normal power source is unavailable.

=== 1+1 redundancy ===
1+1 redundancy typically offers the advantage of additional failover transparency in the event of component failure. The level of resilience is referred to as active/active or hot as backup components actively participate with the system during normal operation. Failover is generally transparent (no disruption to system availability) as failover does not actually occur (just degradation to system resilience) as the backup components were already active within the system.

- Dual active power supplies in a server.
- Mirrored hard drives within a server/PC system.

=== 2+1 or 3+1 redundancy ===
2+1 redundancy or 3+1 redundancy is common on power systems for blade servers where a relatively small number of highly rated Uninterruptible Power Supplies (UPS) efficiently power a greater number of blades. An example is a server chassis that has three power supplies; the system may be set to 2+1 redundancy so that the blades can enjoy the power of two PSUs and have one available to give redundancy if one fails. It is also common to mix live (hot) redundancy where UPSes are online, and cold standby redundancy where they are offline until needed. The reason for this, in the case of UPSes, is that a common failure mode is component's end-of-life failure, and if UPSes are equally used, then they are highly likely to fail within a short space of time of each other when toward the end of service life.

== Applications ==
Redundant systems are often used in data centers to maximise uptime or availability of computer systems. Other common implementations include aerospace, where redundant systems are used to improve safety and integrity of spacecraft, electric power systems and automobiles, where the emergency brake is available in a car as a redundant component in case of failure of the main brake systems. The German power system, which has N+1 redundancy and is known as "(n-1) Sicherheit" in German, is one example of its application.

== See also ==
- High availability
- High-availability cluster
- RAID
