= List of PowerEdge servers =

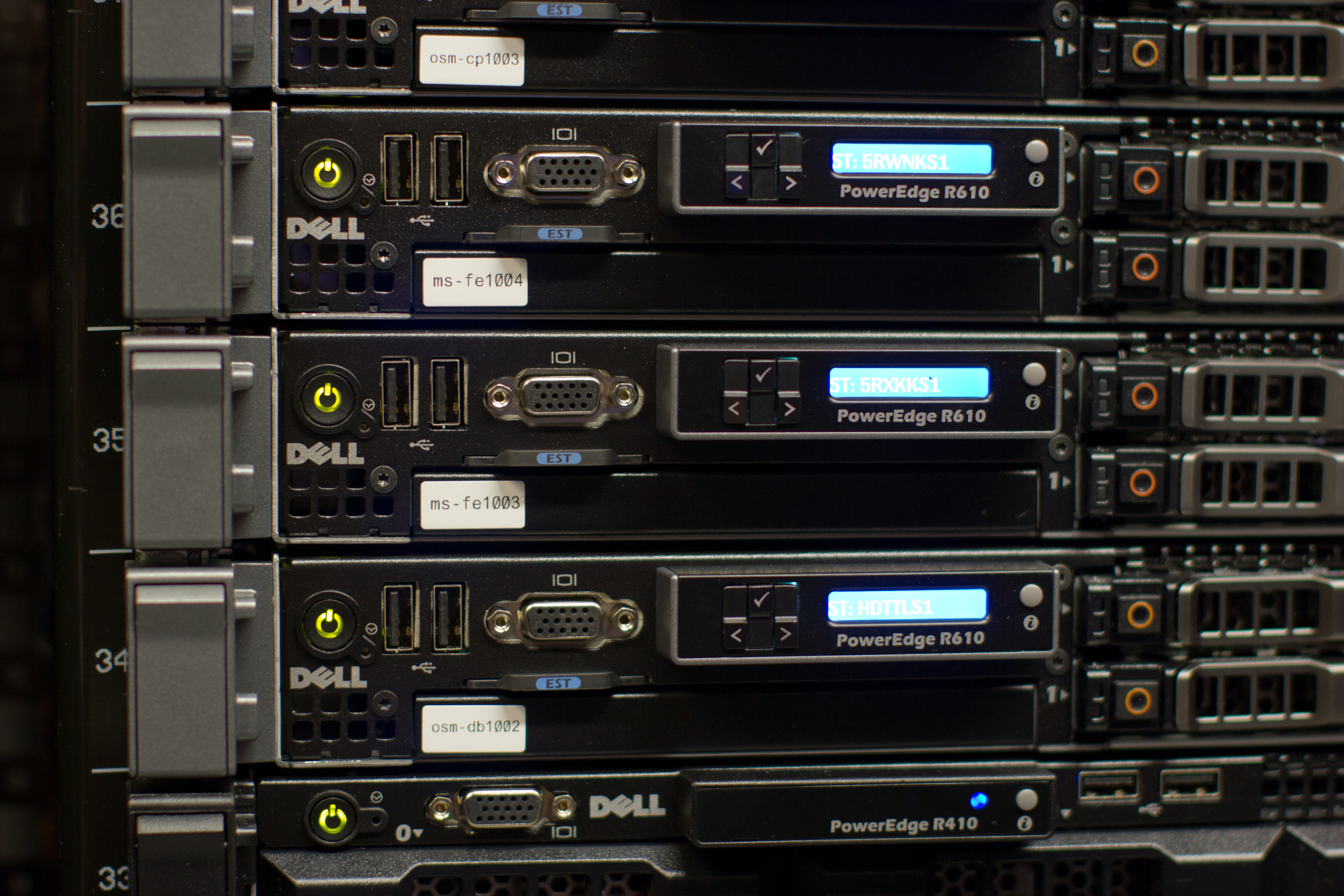
Rack-mounted 11th-generation PowerEdge servers

PowerEdge is a server line by Dell, following the naming convention for other Dell products: PowerVault (data storage) and PowerConnect (data transfer & switches).

Below is an overview of current and former servers within Dell's PowerEdge product line. Different models are or were available as towers, 19-inch racks or blades. In the current naming scheme, towers are designated by T, racks by R, and blades by M (for modular). The 19" rack-servers come in different physical heights expressed in rack units or U. Most modern servers are either 1U or 2U high while in the past the 4U was more common.

== Model naming ==
Over the years, many different types of PowerEdge servers have been introduced and a wide variety of product and family codes were used within the PowerEdge name.

=== Itanium servers ===
The Dell Itanium-based servers were introduced before this new naming convention was introduced and were only available as rack servers.

=== New naming conventions ===
Three digits

Since the introduction of the Generation 10 servers in 2007 Dell has adopted a standardized method for naming their servers; the name of each server is now represented by a letter followed by 3 digits. The letter indicates the type of server: R (for Rack-mountable) indicates a 19" rack-mountable server, M (for Modular) indicates a blade server, and T (for Tower) indicates a stand-alone server.

This letter is then followed by three digits.

- The first digit refers to the number of sockets in the system: 1 to 3 for one socket, 4 to 7 for two sockets, and 8 or 9 for four sockets.
- The middle digit refers to the generation: 0 for Generation 10, 1 for Generation 11, and so on.
- The third digit indicates the make of the CPU: 0 for Intel or 5 for AMD.

For example: The Dell PowerEdge M610 is a two-socket blade server of the 11th generation using an Intel CPU. Whereas the R605 is a two-socket, 10th generation AMD-based rack-server.

Four digits

For four-digit naming convention:

- The first digit after the letter indicates the class of the system, with 1–5 defaulting to iDRAC Basic and 6–9 defaulting to iDRAC Express.
- The second digit indicates the generation, with 0 for 10th generation, 1 for 11th generation and so on.
- The third digit indicates the number of CPU sockets, 1 for one socket and 2 for two sockets.
- The fourth digit indicates the make of the CPU, 0 for Intel and 5 for AMD.

For example: The Dell PowerEdge R6415 model is a rack, mid-range, 14th generation, single CPU socket system with AMD Processor.

== Blade servers ==
Since Generation 10, there are models for the M1000e enclosure. The blade-servers in Generation 8 and Generation 9 use another enclosure that is not compatible with the current M1000e system. In form-factor there are two models: half-height and full-height.

One enclosure can hold 8 full-height or 16 half-height blades (or a mix). Each server has two or four on-board NICs and two additional Mezzanine card slots for additional I/O options: 1 Gb or 10 Gb Ethernet cards, Fibre Channel HBAs or InfiniBand slots. Apart from USB connectors, a blade-server doesn't offer direct connections; all I/O goes via the midplane of the enclosure.

== Early systems ==
Early systems (SP, XE, EL, XL lines)
Model	Chassis	Year	Chipset	CPU (No. & Socket)	CPU (Type)	RAM (Max)	RAM (Type)	Drive bays	Comments
SP 433	Tower			1	Intel 80486DX 33 MHz (P4)				EISA/PCI
SP 450	Tower			1	Intel 80486DX2 50 MHz (P24)				EISA/PCI
SP 466	Tower			1	Intel 80486DX2 66 MHz (P24)				EISA/PCI
SP 560	Tower			1 Socket 4	Pentium 60 60 MHz (P5)				EISA/PCI
SP 566	Tower			1 Socket 4	Pentium 66 66 MHz (P5)				EISA/PCI
SP 575-2	Tower	1995		1,2 Socket 5	Pentium 75 75 MHz (P54C)				EISA/PCI
SP 590	Tower	1994		1 Socket 5	Pentium 90 90 MHz (P54C)	192 MB	SIMM	8	EISA/PCI
SP 590-2	Tower			1,2 Socket 5	Pentium 90 90 MHz (P54C)				EISA/PCI
SP 5100	Tower			1,2	Pentium 100 100 MHz (P54C)				EISA/PCI
SP 5100-2	Tower			1,2	Pentium 100 100 MHz (P54C)				EISA/PCI
SP 5133	Tower			1,2	Pentium 133 133 MHz (P54CS)				EISA/PCI
SP 5133-2	Tower			1,2	Pentium 133 133 MHz (P54CS)				EISA/PCI
SP 5166	Tower			1,2	Pentium 166 166 MHz (P54CS)				EISA/PCI
SP 5166-2	Tower			1,2	Pentium 166 166 MHz (P54CS)				EISA/PCI
XE 433	Tower			1	Intel 80486DX 33 MHz (P4)				EISA/PCI
XE 450	Tower			1	Intel 80486DX2 50 MHz (P24)				EISA/PCI
XE 466	Tower			1	Intel 80486DX2 66 MHz (P24)				EISA/PCI
XE 560	Tower			1 Socket 4	Pentium 60 60 MHz (P5)				EISA/PCI
XE 566	Tower			1 Socket 4	Pentium 66 66 MHz (P5)				EISA/PCI
XE 575-2	Tower			1,2 Socket 5	Pentium 75 75 MHz (P54C)				EISA/PCI
XE 590	Tower			1,2 Socket 5	Pentium 90 90 MHz (P54C)				EISA/PCI
XE 590-2	Tower			1,2 Socket 5	Pentium 90 90 MHz (P54C)				EISA/PCI
XE 5100	Tower			1,2	Pentium 100 100 MHz (P54C)				EISA/PCI
XE 5100-2	Tower			1,2	Pentium 100 100 MHz (P54C)				EISA/PCI
XE 5133	Tower			1,2	Pentium 133 133 MHz (P54CS)				EISA/PCI
XE 5133-2	Tower			1,2	Pentium 133 133 MHz (P54CS)				EISA/PCI
XE 5166	Tower			1,2	Pentium 166 166 MHz (P54CS)				EISA/PCI
XE 5166-2	Tower			1,2	Pentium 166 166 MHz (P54CS)				EISA/PCI
EL 575	Tower				Pentium 75 75 MHz (P54C)				ISA/PCI
EL 590	Tower				Pentium 90 90 MHz (P54C)				ISA/PCI
EL 5100	Tower				Pentium 100 100 MHz (P54C)				ISA/PCI
EL 5120	Tower				Pentium 120 120 MHz (P54CQS)				ISA/PCI
EL 5133	Tower				Pentium 133 133 MHz (P54CS)				ISA/PCI
Web Server	Tower	1995			Pentium 133 133 MHz (P54CS)				ISA/PCI, based on quad processor EL
XL 5133	Tower			1-4 (single, quad capable)	Pentium 133 133 MHz (P54CS)				EISA/PCI
XL 5133-2	Tower			1-4 (dual, quad capable)	Pentium 133 133 MHz (P54CS)				EISA/PCI
XL 5133-4	Tower			1-4 (quad)	Pentium 133 133 MHz (P54CS)				EISA/PCI
XL 5166	Tower			1-4 (single, quad capable)	Pentium 166 166 MHz (P54CS)				EISA/PCI
XL 5166-2	Tower			1-4 (dual, quad capable)	Pentium 166 166 MHz (P54CS)				EISA/PCI
XL 5166-4	Tower			1-4 (quad)	Pentium 166 166 MHz (P54CS)				EISA/PCI

== Generation 1 ==
Model	Chassis	Year	Chipset	CPU (No. & Socket)	CPU (Type)	RAM (Max)	RAM (Type)	Drive bays	Comments
2100	Tower	1996	Intel 440FX	1 Socket 8	Pentium Pro 180 MHz or 200 MHz	256 MB	4, 168-pin DIMM		
4100	Tower			2 Socket 8	Pentium Pro 180 MHz or 200 MHz	1 GB	8, 168-pin DIMM		
6100	Tower			4 Socket 8	Pentium Pro 200 MHz	2 GB	16, 72-pin		

== Generation 2 ==
Model	Chassis	Year	Chipset	CPU (No. & Socket)	CPU (Type)	RAM (Max)	RAM (Type)	Drive bays	Comments
2200	Tower			2	Pentium II, 233 - 333 MHz	512 MB	4, ECC	3 full size SCSI drives (screw in)	
4200	Tower		Intel 440FX	2	Pentium II 233, 266, 300, or 333 MHz	512 MB	8, 168-pin EDO DIMM		

== Generation 3 ==
Model	Chassis	Year	Chipset	CPU (No. & Socket)	CPU (Type)	RAM (Max)	RAM (Type)	Drive bays	Comments
350	1U Rack	circa 2001	Intel 440BX		Pentium III 650Mhz-1.0 GHz or Celeron 600+	1 GB	4, SDRAM unbuffered and registered PC-100	(2) int. 3.5 ATA-100 (1) slim 3.5" floppy (1) slim CD-ROM	(2) Intel 82559 10/100; 125 W 898 BTU/hr (max)
1300	Tower		Intel 440BX	1	Pentium II at 350, 400, or 450 MHz	1 GB	unbuffered, 72-bit SDRAM or registered, 72-bit SDRAM		
2300	Tower	1998	Intel 440BX	2	Pentium II 333, 350, 400, 450 MHz	1 GB	4, unregistered PC-100 SDRAM	6 Ultra2 SCSI HDD bays	
4300	7U Rack		Intel 440GX	2	Pentium II 350, 400, or 450 MHz	1 GB	4, 168-pin unbuffered DIMMs or registered DIMMs	8 SCSI bays	
4350	4u Rack		Intel 440GX	2	Pentium II 350, 400, or 450 MHz	2 GB			
6300	Tower			4	Pentium II Xeon	4 GB	4, registered EDO DIMM	6 Ultra2 SCSI HDD bays	
6350	4U Rack			4	Pentium II Xeon at 400 MHz	4 GB	16, registered EDO DIMM	3 HDD bays	

== Generation 4 ==
Model	Chassis	Year	Chipset	CPU (No. & Socket)	CPU (Type)	RAM (Max)	RAM (Type)	Drive bays	Comments
2400	Tower	2000		2	Pentium III 500 MHz minimum	2 GB	4, registered PC-133 SDRAM	6 Ultra2 SCSI HDD bays	
2450	2U Rack	2001		2	Pentium III 600 MHz minimum	2 GB	168-pin registered SDRAM 133-MHz		
4400	7U Rack or Tower			2	Pentium III Xeon, 600 MHz minimum	4 GB	registered PC133 SDRAM	Up to 10 internal SCSI bays	Introduced circa 1999
6400	Tower			4	Pentium III Xeon, 550 MHz minimum	8 GB	16, registered PC-133 SDRAM	6 or 8 Ultra3 SCSI drives	Introduced circa 1999
6450	4U Rack			4	Pentium III Xeon 550 MHz	8 GB	16, registered PC-133 SDRAM	4 internal SCSI bays	Introduced circa 1999
8450	Rack	2000		8	Pentium III Xeon 500 MHz	32 GB	168-pin SDRAM 100 MHz		

== Generation 5 ==
Model	Chassis	Year	Chipset	CPU (No. & Socket)	CPU (Type)	RAM (Max)	RAM (Type)	Drive bays	Comments
1500SC	Tower			2, Socket 370	Pentium III (1.13 GHz-1.4 GHz)	4GB	4, registered PC-133 SDRAM	6 hot-swappable Ultra3 SCSI HDD bays	
1550	1U Rack	2001	ServerWorks HE-SL	2, Socket 370	Pentium III (933 MHz-1.4 GHz)	4GB	4, registered PC-133 SDRAM	3 hot-swappable Ultra3 SCSI HDD bays	
2500	Tower or 5U Rack			2, Socket 370	Pentium III 933 MHz minimum	4 GB	6, ECC registered PC-133 SDRAM	6 hot-swappable Ultra3 SCSI HDD bays, splittable	
2550	2U Rack			2, Socket 370	Pentium III 933 MHz minimum	4 GB	registered PC133 SDRAM	5 internal SCSI bays	Introduced circa 2001

== Itanium ==
The Itanium line was a separate 'generation' from the traditional server line, but roughly falls between generations 5 and 6.

Itanium systems (3250, 7150, 7250 models (2001–2004))
Model	Chassis	Year	Chipset	CPU (No. & Socket)	CPU (Type)	RAM (Max)	RAM (Type)	Drive bays	Comments
3250	2U Rack	2003	Intel E8870	2 PAC611	Intel Itanium 2 1.5 GHz, 1.3 GHz, 1.4 GHz, 1.0 GHz	16 GB	DDR SDRAM	2 x 1" SCSI drives	
7150	7U Rack	2001		4 PAC418	Intel Itanium minimum 733 MHz	64 GB	PC100 memory	4 hotplug SCSI bays	
7250	Rack	2004	Intel E8870	4 PAC611	Intel Itanium 2	32 GB	DDR ECC memory	3 hotplug SCSI bays	

== Generation 6 ==
Model	Chassis	Year	Chipset	CPU (No. & Socket)	CPU (Type)	RAM (Max)	RAM (Type)	Drive bays	Comments
650	1U Rack	2003		1	Pentium 4 up to 3.06 GHz or Celeron up to 1.8 GHz	3 GB	DDR	2× IDE or SCSI	
1650	1U Rack	2002		2	Pentium III 1.13 GHz+	4 GB	4, ECC SDRAM 133		
1655 MC	3U Blade	2004	ServerWorks ServerSet LE3.0	2 (per Blade)	Pentium III at 1.4 GHz	2 GB (per Blade)	4, ECC SDRAM 133		Houses up to 6 blades
2600	Tower or 5U Rack	2004	Intel E7501	2 Socket 604	Xeon III at 2.4 GHz, 2.8 GHz, 3.06 GHz, and 3.2 GHz	12 GB	6, ECC DDR 266	6 HDD bays (SCSI)	
2650	2U Rack	2004	ServerWorks GC-LE	2 Socket 603	Xeon at 2.0 GHz, 2.4 GHz, 2.8 GHz, 3.06 GHz, and 3.2 GHz	12 GB	6, ECC DDR 266	5 HDD bays (SCSI)	
4600	Tower or 6U Rack	2003	ServerWorks GC-HE	2 Socket 603	Xeon at 2.4 GHz, 2.6 GHz, 2.8 GHz to 3.0 GHz	24 GB	ECC DDR		2 RAM riser cards
6600	Tower or 7U Rack	2004	ServerWorks GC-HE	4	Xeon MP at 2.0 GHz, 2.2 GHz, 2.7 GHz or 3.0 GHz	32 GB	ECC DDR 266	8 SCSI	4 RAM riser cards
6650	4U Rack	2004	ServerWorks GC-HE	4	Xeon MP at 1.4 GHz, 2.0 GHz, 2.2 GHz, 2.7 GHz or 3.0 GHz	32 GB	ECC DDR 266	5 SCSI	4 RAM riser cards

== Generation 7 ==
Model	Chassis	Year	Chipset	CPU (No. & Socket)	CPU (Type)	RAM (Max)	RAM (Type)	Drive bays	Comments
700	Tower	2004	Intel E7210	1 Socket 478	Pentium 4(up to 3.2 GHz/800 MHz) or Celeron (2.4 GHz)	4 GB	DDR 400	4 HDD bays	
750	1U Rack	2005	Intel E7210	1 Socket 478	Pentium 4(up to 3.4 GHz/800 MHz) or Celeron (2.4 GHz)	4 GB	DDR 400	2 SCSI or SATA	
1750	1U Rack	2004	ServerWorks GC LE	2 Socket 604	Xeon up to 3.2 GHz	8 GB	4, DDR 266	3 HDD bays (SCSI)	

== Generation 8 ==
Model	Chassis	Year	Chipset	CPU (No. & Socket)	CPU (Type)	RAM (Max)	RAM (Type)	Drive bays	Comments
800	Tower	2005	Intel E7221	1 LGA 775	Pentium 4 up to 3.8 GHz or Celeron up to 2.53 GHz	4 GB	4, ECC DDR2 400/533	4 × 1" SCSI or SATA	
830	Tower	2005	Intel E7230	1 LGA 775	Pentium D up to 3.2 GHz or Pentium 4 up to 3.6 GHz or Celeron D 2.53 GHz	8 GB	4, ECC DDR2 533-667	4 × HDD bays	
840 (Gen I, II)	Tower	2006	Intel 3000	1 LGA 775	Xeon X3200 (Gen II only), Xeon 3000, Pentium or Celeron	8 GB	4, ECC DDR2 533-667	2 × 5.25" ext. 1 × 3.5" ext. 4 × 3.5" int. 4 SATA 2 IDE	
1800	Tower or 5U Rack		Intel E7520	2 Socket 604	Xeon, 800 MHz FSB	12 GB	6, ECC DDR2	6 × HDD bays (SCSI)	
1850	1U Rack	2005	Intel E7520	2 Socket 604	Xeon, 800 MHz FSB	16 GB	6, ECC DDR2 400	2 × HDD bays (SCSI)	
1855	Blade	2005	Intel E7520	2 Socket 604	Xeon, 800 MHz FSB	12 GB	6, ECC DDR2	2 × HDD bays per blade (SCSI)	Uses same blade chassis as 1955, up to 10 blades
2800	Tower or 5U Rack	2005	Intel E7520	2 Socket 604	Xeon Single or Dual-core	16 GB	6, DDR2 400	8 to 10 HDD bays (SCSI)	
2850	2U Rack	2005	Intel E7520	2 Socket 604	Xeon up to 3.8 GHz or Dual-core Xeon at 2.8 GHz	16 GB	6, DDR2 400	6 × HDD bays (SCSI)	
6800	Tower	2006	Intel E8501	4 Socket 604	Xeon 7100	64 GB	16*, ECC DDR2	10 Hotplug SCSI bays	RAM slots only with daughterboard
6850	4U Rack	2006	Intel E8501	4 Socket 604	Xeon 7100	64 GB	16*, ECC DDR2	5 Hotplug SCSI bays	RAM slots only with daughterboard

== Generation 9 ==
Model	Chassis	Year	Chipset	CPU Sockets	CPU	RAM (Max)	RAM (Type)	Drive bays	Comments
850	1U Rack	2005	Intel E7230	1 LGA 775	Intel Pentium 4 (up to 3.8 GHz) or Celeron (2.53 GHz) or Pentium D dual-core (up to 3.2 GHz)	8 GB	4, ECC DDR2 533/667 MHz	2 × 3.5" SATA or SCSI	
860 (Gen I, II)	1U Rack	2006	Intel 3000	1 LGA 775	Celeron D, Pentium D 925, Celeron 430/440, Pentium Dual-Core E2160, Core 2 Duo E4400, Xeon 3000, Xeon 3200	8 GB	4, ECC DDR2 533/667 MHz	2 × 3.5" SATA or SAS and 1 × slim optical	The PE 850 and 860 share chassis with the R200, and other than name badge are visually identical.
1900	Tower	2006	Intel 5000P	2 LGA 771	Xeon 5000, 5100 or 5300	16 GB	8, DDR2 533/667 MHz FB-DIMM	6 × 3.5" SAS/SATA and 1 × Peripheral bay and 1 × 3.5" floppy	This model replaces the 1800. Peripheral bay can hold 2 × 5.25" devices
1950 (Gen I, II, III)	1U Rack	2006	Intel 5000X	2 LGA 771	GI: Xeon 5000, 5100; GII: Xeon 5000, 5100, 5300; GIII: Xeon 5000, 5100, 5200, 5300, 5400	GI & GII: 32 GB; GIII: 64 GB	GI & GII: 8, ECC DDR2 533/667 MHz FB-DIMM; GIII: 8, ECC DDR2 667 MHz FB-DIMM	2 × 3.5" SAS/SATA or 4 × 2.5" SAS and 1 × slim optical	
1955	Blade	2006	Intel 5000P	2 LGA 771	Xeon 5000, 5100 or 5300	32 GB	8, ECC DDR2 FB-DIMM	2 × 2.5" SAS/SATA	Uses same blade chassis as 1855. Up to 10 blades
2900 (Gen I, II, III)	Tower or 5U	2006	Intel 5000X	2 LGA 771	Xeon 5000, 5100, 5300 or 5400	48 GB	12, ECC DDR2 533/667 MHz FB-DIMM	8 × 3.5" SAS/SATA and 1 × Flexbay and 1 × Peripheral bay and 1 × 3.5" floppy	Flexbay can hold 2 × 3.5" HDD. Peripheral bay can hold 2 × 5.25" devices
2950 (Gen I, II, III)	2U Rack	2006	Intel 5000X	2 LGA 771	GI: Xeon 5000, 5100; GII: Xeon 5000, 5100, 5300; GIII: Xeon 5000, 5100, 5200, 5300, 5400	GI: 32 GB; GII & GIII: 64 GB	GI & GII: 8, ECC DDR2 533/667 MHz FB-DIMM; GIII: 8, ECC DDR2 667 MHz FB-DIMM	8 × 2.5" SAS and 1 × Peripheral bay or 4 × 3.5" SAS/SATA and 1 × Peripheral bay or 6 × 3.5" SAS/SATA and 1 × slim optical	All configurations include 1 × slim optical drive. Peripheral bay options: Floppy Drive, DAT72 Tape Drive
2970	2U Rack	2007	Broadcom HT-2100 and HT-1000	2 Socket F	Opteron 2200	32 GB	8, ECC DDR2 667 MHz	8 × 2.5" SAS/SATA II or 6 × 3.5" SAS/SATA and 1 × Peripheral bay and 1 × slim optical	Peripheral bay options; Floppy Drive, PowerVault 100T Tape Drive
6950	4U Rack	2006	Broadcom HT-2100 and HT-1000	4 Socket F	Opteron 8200 or 8300	64 GB	16, ECC DDR2 667 MHz	5 × 3.5" SAS and 1 × slim optical	

== Generation 10 ==
Model	Chassis	Year	Chipset	CPU (No. & Socket)	CPU (Type)	RAM (Max)	RAM (Type)	Drive bays	Comments
T100	Tower	2008	Intel 3200	1 LGA 775	Xeon 3000, Core 2 Duo 7000, Pentium 2000, Celeron 1200 or Celeron 400	8 GB	4, ECC DDR2 677-800	2 × 3.5" SATA or SAS and 2 × 5.25"	
T105	Tower	2008	nVidia CK8-04 Pro	1 Socket AM2	Opteron 1200, Opteron 1300, Sempron LE1250	8 GB	4, ECC DDR2 677-800	2 × 3.5" SATA or SAS and 2 × 5.25"	
R200	1U Rack	2010	Intel 3200	1 LGA 775	Xeon 3000, Core 2 Duo, Celeron	8 GB	4, ECC DDR2 667-800 SDRAM (Note: 2 channels)	2 × 3.5" non-hot-swap SATA or SAS and 1 × 5.25" removable CD/DVD	
T300	Tower	2007	Intel 5100	1 LGA 771	Xeon 5000, Xeon 3000, Core 2 Duo, Celeron	24 GB	6, ECC DDR2 667	4 × 3.5" SATA or SAS	
R300	1U Rack		Intel 3400	1 LGA 771	Xeon 5000, Xeon 3000, Core 2 Duo, Celeron	24 GB	6, ECC DDR2 667	2 × 3.5"	
M600	Blade		Intel 5000P	2 LGA 771	Xeon 5000	64 GB	8, ECC DDR2 667		Fits in the M1000E chassis
T605	Tower	2008	Broadcom HT2100 and HT1000	2 Socket F	Opteron 2000	32 GB	8, ECC DDR2	4 × 3.5" and 1 × 5.25"	
M605	Blade		NVIDIA MCP55	2 Socket F	Opteron 2000, 2200 or 2300	64 GB	8, ECC DDR2 800	2 × 2.5" SAS or SATA	Fits in the M1000E chassis
R805	2U Rack	2008	NVIDIA MCP55Pro + IO-55	2 Socket F	Opteron 2400	128 GB	16, ECC DDR2	2 × 2.5" and 1 × slim optical	
M805	Blade		NVIDIA MCP55		Opteron 2000	128 GB	16, ECC DDR2 667-800	2 × 2.5" SAS or SSD	Fits in the M1000E chassis
R900	4U Rack		Intel 7300	4 Socket 604	Xeon 7200, 7300 or 7400	256 GB	32, FBD DDR2 667-1333	5 × 3.5" SAS or 8 × 2.5" SAS	
R905	4U Rack		Broadcom HT-2100 and HT-1100	4	Opteron 8000	256 GB	32, ECC DDR2	8 × 2.5" or 5 × 3.5"	EOL : 7/23/2015
M905	Blade		NVIDIA MCP55	4	Opteron 8000	192 GB	24, ECC DDR2 667–800	2 × 2.5" SAS or SSD	Fits in the M1000E chassis

== Generation 11 ==
Released by Dell in 2010

Model	Chassis	Year	Chipset	CPU (No. & Socket)	CPU (Type)	RAM (Max)	RAM (Type)	Drive bays	Comments
T110	Tower		Intel 3420	1 LGA 1156	Xeon 3400, Celeron G1101, Pentium G6950, Core i3-530 or i3-540	16 GB	4, U-DIMMs ECC DDR3 1066-1333	4 × 3.5" SAS or SATA	
T110 II	Tower	2011	Intel C202	1 LGA 1155	Xeon E3-1200 or E3-1200 v2, Celeron G400 / G500, Pentium G600 / G800	32 GB	4, U-DIMMs ECC DDR3 1066-1600	4 × 3.5" or 6 × 2.5" SAS or SATA	
R210	1U Rack		Intel 3420	1 LGA 1156	Xeon 3400, Celeron G1101, Pentium G6950 or Core i3-500	16 GB	4, U-DIMMs ECC DDR3 1066-1333	2 × 2.5" or 2 × 3.5" SAS, SATA or SSD	
R210 II	1U Rack	2011	Intel C202	1 LGA 1155	Xeon E3-1200 or E3-1200 v2, Celeron G400 / G500, Pentium G600 / G800	32 GB	4, U-DIMMs ECC DDR3 1066-1600	4 × 2.5" or 2 × 3.5" SAS, SATA or SSD	
T310	Tower		Intel 3400	1 LGA 1156	Xeon 3400, Celeron G1101, Pentium G6950 or Core i3-500	32 GB	6, R-DIMMs or 4, U-DIMMs, DDR3 800-1333	4 × 3.5" SAS or SATA	
R310	1U Rack		Intel 3420	1 LGA 1156	Xeon 3400, Celeron G1101, Pentium G6950, Core i3-530 or i3-540	32 GB	6, 1066–1333	4 × 3.5" or 4 × 2.5” SAS or SATA	
T410	Tower	2009	Intel 5500	2 LGA 1366	Xeon 5500 or 5600	128 GB	8, DDR3 800-1333	6 × 3.5" and 2 × 5.25" SSD, SAS or SATA	
R410	1U Rack	2009	Intel 5500	2 LGA 1366	Xeon 5500 or 5600	128 GB	8, DDR3 800-1333	4 × 3.5" or 4 × 2.5"	
R415	1U Rack		AMD SR5670 & SP5100	2 C32	Opteron 4100, 4200 or 4300	256 GB	8, DDR3 1066/1333	4 × 2.5" or 4 × 3.5" SAS or SATA	
R510	2U Rack		Intel 5500	2 LGA 1366	Xeon 5500 or 5600	128 GB	8, DDR3 800-1333	4 × 3.5" or 8 × 2.5"/3.5" or 12 × 2.5"/3.5" and 2 × 2.5" internal	
R515	2U Rack	2010	AMD SR5670 & SP5100	2 C32	Rev I: Opteron 4100; Rev II: 4100, 4200 or 4300	Opteron 4100: 128 GB; Opteron 4200/4300: 256 GB	8, DDR3 1333–1600	12 × 2.5" or 8 × 3.5"	
T610 (Gen I, II)	Tower or 5U Rack		Intel 5520	2 LGA 1366	Xeon 5500 or 5600	192 GB	12, RDIMM or UDIMM DDR3 800-1333	Up to 8 × 3.5"/2.5" SSD, SAS or SATA	
R610 (Gen I, II)	1U Rack		Intel 5520	2 LGA 1366	Xeon 5500 or 5600	192 GB	12, DDR3 800-1333	6 × 2.5" SAS or SSD	
M610 (Gen I, II)	Blade		Intel 5520	2 LGA 1366	Xeon 5500 or 5600	192 GB	12, ECC DDR3	2 × 2.5" SAS/SSD	Fits in the M1000E chassis
T710 (Gen I, II)	Tower or 5U Rack		Intel 5520	2 LGA 1366	Xeon 5500 or 5600	288 GB	18, DDR3 800–1333	16 × 2.5" or 8 × 3.5"	
R710 (Gen I, II)	2U Rack	2009	Intel 5520	2 LGA 1366	Xeon 5500 or 5600	288 GB	18, DDR3 800-1333	8 × 2.5" or 6 × 3.5"	Gen I: No 130 W CPUs
R715	2U Rack	2010	AMD SR5650, SR5670, SP5100	2 G34	Opteron 6100 or 6200	256 GB	16, DDR3 800–1600	8 × 2.5" or 6 × 3.5"	
M710 (Gen I, II)	Blade		Intel 5520	2 LGA 1366	Xeon 5500 or 5600	192 GB	18, DDR3	4 × 2.5" SAS or SSD	Fits in the M1000E chassis
R810	2U Rack		Intel 7500	4 LGA 1567	Xeon 6500 or 7500	1 TB	32, DDR3 1066	6 × 2.5" SAS, SATA or SATA SSD	
R815	2U Rack		AMD SR5650, SR5670, SP5100	4 G34	Opteron 6100	1 TB	32, DDR3 1333	6 × 2.5" SAS, SATA or SATA SSD	
R910	4U Rack		Intel 7500	4 LGA 1567	Xeon 7500 or E7-4/8800	2 TB	64, DDR3 1066	16 × 2.5" SAS or SSD	R910 servers using Xeon 7500 CPUs are limited to 1 TB of memory since 32 GB DIMMs are not supported
M910	Blade		Intel 7500	4 LGA 1567	Xeon 6500 or 7500	512 GB	32, ECC DDR3	2 × 2.5" SAS or SSD	Fits in the M1000E chassis
C1100	1U Rack		Intel 5500	2 LGA 1366	Xeon 5500 or 5600	192 GB	18, ECC DDR3 1066-1333	10 × 2.5" or 4 × 3.5"	
C2100	2U Rack		Intel 5500	2 LGA 1366	Xeon 5500 or 5600	192 GB	18, ECC DDR3 1066-1333	12 × 3.5" and 2 × 2.5" internal SATA or SSD	
C6100	2U Rack		Intel 5520	8 LGA 1366	Xeon 5500 or 5600	768 GB	48, DDR3 1066-1333	24 × 2.5" or 12 × 3.5"	

== Generation 12 ==
In March 2012 Dell introduced their 12th generation servers based on Intel Xeon. There are two basic lines: 620 and 720. On the 720 line, Dell currently offers two rack-model servers: the Poweredge R720 and the R720XD — where the latter offers the option to extend the system to up to 26 internal disks.

The Poweredge 620 series offer models for rack, tower and a ½ height blade-server M620. A ½ height blade means that you can fit up to 16 of those servers in one M1000e enclosure. The M520 and M620 can also be used in the new PowerEdge VRTX system. The new M420 is 1/4 height, so 32 fit in a M1000e chassis but does require a special full height holder that fits 4 M420's in one full-height (=double) slot.

For the Generation 12 server-line the out of band server-management system iDRAC received a new version: iDRAC 7. iDRAC allows you to access the server-console via a separate Ethernet connection allowing you to get access to the server even when there is no (working) operating system or (normal) network connection available. It offers more or less the same functionality as a network-enabled KVM switch, but with some additional options.

An overview of the offered servers as per July 2012

Model	Chassis	Year	Chipset	CPU (No. & Socket)	CPU (Type)	RAM (Max)	RAM (Type)	Internal Storage (Max)	Drive bays	PCI(e) slots	On board network
R220	1U Rack		C222	1 LGA 1150	Xeon E3-1200 v3	32 GB	4, DIMM; DDR3, 1600 MHz		2 × 2.5" or 2 × 3.5"	1: 1 - x16 FH/FL	Dual 1 GB
R320	1U Rack		C602	1 LGA 1356	Xeon E5-2400 or E5-2400 v2 or E5-1400	192 GB	6, DIMM; DDR3, 1600 MHz	16 TB	8 × 2.5" or 4 × 3.5"	2: 1x16 FH/HL, 1x8 HH/HL	Broadcom Dual 1 GB
R420	1U Rack		C602	2 LGA 1356	Xeon E5-2400 or E5-2400 v2	384 GB	12, DIMM; DDR3, 1600 MHz	16 TB	8 × 2.5" or 4 × 3.5"	2: 1x16 FH/HL, 1x16 HH/HL (with 2 cpu) or 2: 1x16 FH/HL, 1x8 HH/HL (with 1 cpu)	Broadcom Dual 1 Gb
R520	2U Rack		C602	2 LGA 1356	Xeon E5-2400 or E5-2400 v2	384 GB	12, DIMM; DDR3, 1600 MHz	32 TB	8 x 2.5" or 8 x 3.5"	1x16x HH/HL at 16x, 1x16x FH/FL at 8x, 2x16 FH/HL at 8x(with 2 cpu)	Broadcom Dual 1 Gb
R620	1U Rack	2012	C600	2 LGA 2011	Xeon E5-2600 or E5-2600 v2	1.5 TB	24, DIMM; DDR3, 1600 MHz	10 TB	8 × 2.5" or 4 × 3.5" + 2 × PCIe SSD or 10 × 2.5"	3: 2 - x16 FH/FL, 1 - x8 FH/FL or 2, 2 x x16	Broadcom or Intel 4× 1GBor 2× 10 GB
T620	Tower rackable, 5U	2012	C600	2 LGA 2011	Xeon E5-2600 or E5-2600 v2	768 GB	24, DIMM; DDR3, 1866Mhz	36 TB	8 × 3.5" + 4 × PCIe SSD or 12 × 3.5" or 16 × 2.5" + 4 × PCIe SSD or 32 × 2.5"	7: 4 - x16 FH/FL, 2 - x8 FH/FL, 1 - x8 (x4bw) FH/FL	Intel Dual 1 GB
R720	2U Rack	2012	C600	2 LGA 2011	Xeon E5-2600 or E5-2600 v2	1.5 TB	24, DIMM; DDR3, 1600Mhz	25 TB	8 × 3.5" or 16 × 2.5"	7: 1x16 FH/FL, 3x8 FH/FL, 3x8 HH/HL	Broadcom or Intel 4× 1GBor 2× 10 GB
R720XD	2U Rack	2012	C600	2 LGA 2011	Xeon E5-2600 or E5-2600 v2	1.5 TB	24, DIMM; DDR3, 1600Mhz	38 TB	26 × 2.5" or 12 × 3.5" + 2 × 2.5"	6: 2 - x16 FH/FL, 1 - x8 FH/FL, 3 - x8 HH/HL	Broadcom or Intel 4× 1GBor 2× 10 GB
R820	2U Rack	2012	C600	4 LGA 2011	Xeon E5-4600	1.5 TB	48, DIMM; DDR3 1600 MHz	16 TB	16 × 2.5"	7: 2 - x16 HL/FH, 1 - x8 HL/FH, 3 - x8 HL/HH, 1 - x8 HL/FH (for RAID controller)	Broadcom or Intel 4× 1GBor 2× 10 Gb
R920	4U Rack	2012	C602J	4 LGA 2011	Xeon E7-2800/4800/8800 v2	6 TB	96, DIMM; DDR3 1600 MHz	28.8 TB	24 × 2.5"		Broadcom or Intel 4× 1GBor 2× 10 Gb
M420	Blade; 1/4 height	2012	C600	2 LGA 1356	Xeon E5-2400	192 GB	6, DIMM; DDR3, 1600Mhz	2 × 200 GB	2 × 1.8"		Broadcom (Note: BCM57810S) 2× 10 Gb LOM +1 Mezzanine slot
M520	Blade; 1/2 height	2012	C600	2 LGA 1356	Xeon E5-2400	384 GB	12, DIMM; DDR3, 1600Mhz	2 × SATA/SAS HDD/SSD	2 × 2.5"		Broadcom or Intel on board+2 Mezzanine slots
M620	Blade; 1/2 height	2012	C600	2 LGA 2011	Xeon E5-2600	768 GB	24, DIMM; DDR3, 1600Mhz		2 × 2.5"		Broadcom or Intel on board+2 Mezzanine slots
M820	Blade full height	2012	C600	4 LGA 2011	Xeon E5-4600	1.5 TB	48, DIMM; DDR3, 1600 MHz	4 × SAS HDD/SSD or 2 × PCIe flash SSD	4 × 2.5"		2× 10 Gb Converged Ethernet Adaptor on board+2 Mezzanine slots
C6220	2U Rack	2012	C600	8 LGA 2011	Xeon E5-2600	2 TB	64, DIMM; DDR3, 1600 MHz	48 TB	24 × 2.5" or 12 × 3.5"		2× 1GBLOM, 100 Mb mgt + opt. InfiniBand Mezzanine

Other 12th Generation servers, which are comparable in capabilities with the above detailed M or R versions of the same model number, are:

- PE T320 Tower
- PE T420 Tower

== Generation 13 ==
In September 2014 Dell introduced their 13th generation servers based on Intel Xeon

Model	Chassis	Year	Chipset	CPU (No.)	CPU (Type)	RAM (Max)	RAM (Type)	Internal Storage (Max)	Drive bays	PCI(e) 3.0 slots	On board network
T130	Tower	2015	Intel C236	1	Xeon E3-1200 v6	64 GB	4, DDR4 up to 2400 MT/s		4 x 3.5” cabled HDD	1x8 PCIe 3.0 (x16 connector); 2x4 PCIe 3.0 (x8 connector); 1x1 PCIe 3.0 (x1 connector)	Broadcom 2x1Gb
R230	1U Rack	2015	Intel C236	1	Xeon E3-1200 v5	64 GB	4, DDR4 up to 2133 MT/s		2 x 3.5” cabled HDD; 4 x 3.5” cabled HDD; 4 x 3.5” hot-swap or 2.5” hot-swap in hybrid drive carrier	2 x PCIe 3.0 slots	Broadcom 2x1Gb
T330	Tower or 5U Rack	2015	Intel C236	1	Xeon E3-1200 v5 Xeon E3-1200 v6	64 GB	4, DDR4 up to 2133 MT/s [v5] 2400 MT/s [v6]		8 x 3.5” hot-swap	1x8 PCIe 3.0 (x16 connector); 1x4 PCIe 3.0 (x8 connector); 1x4 PCIe 3.0 (x8 connector); 1x1 PCIe 3.0 (x1 connector)	Broadcom 2x1Gb
R330	1U Rack	2015	Intel C236	1	Xeon E3-1200 v5 or Xeon E3-1200 v6 or Intel Core i3 6100 series or Intel Celeron G3900 series or Intel Celeron G3930 or Intel Pentium G4500 series or Intel Pentium G4600 series	64 GB	4, DDR4 up to 2133 MT/s		4 x 3.5” hot-swap; 8 x 2.5” hot-swap	2 x PCIe 3.0 slots + 1 slot for internal storage	2 x 1 Gb
R430	1U Rack	2014	Intel C610	1 / 2	Xeon E5-2600 v3 or Xeon E5-2600 v4	384 GB	12, DDR4 up to 2400 MT/s	20 TB (10 × 2.5" SATA HDD); 18 TB (10 × 2.5" SAS HDD)	10 x 2.5" HDD: SAS, SATA, NL-SAS, SSD; 8 x 2.5" HDD: SAS, SATA, NL-SAS, SSD; 4 × 3.5" SAS, SATA, NL-SAS, SSD	2 × x8 HL/HH x16 (2 CPU)	4 × 1 GbE LOMs
T430	Tower or 5U Rack	2014	Intel C610	1 / 2	Xeon E5-2600 v3 or Xeon E5-2600 v4	384 GB	12, DDR4 up to 2400 MT/s	20 TB (10 × 2.5" SATA HDD); 18 TB (10 × 2.5" SAS HDD)	10 x 2.5" Hot-Plug: SAS, SATA, NL-SAS, SSD; 8 x 3.5" Hot-Plug: SAS, SATA, NL-SAS, SSD; 4 × 3.5" Internal: SAS, SATA, NL-SAS, SSD	4 × PCIe3.0 + 2 x PCIe2.0	2 x 1 GbE LOMs
R530	2U Rack	2014	Intel C610	1 / 2	Xeon E5-2600 v3 or Xeon E5-2600 v4	384 GB	12, DDR4, up to 2400 MT/s	32 TB (8 × 3.5" SATA HDD); 14.4 TB (8 × 3.5" SAS HDD)	8 x 3.5" HDD: SAS, SATA, NL-SAS, SSD	3 × PCIe3.0 + 2 x PCIe2.0	2 x 1 Gb; 4 × 1 Gb; 2 × 1 GB+ 2 × 10 Gb; 4 × 10 Gb; up to 8 x 10 GB+ 12 x 1GBusing PCI extension slot
R630	1U Rack	2014	Intel C610	2	Xeon E5-2600 v3 or Xeon E5-2600 v4	1.5 TB	24, DDR4 up to 2400 MT/s	23 TB (24 × 1.8" SSD); 17 TB (10 × 2.5" SAS HDD); 14 TB (8 × 2.5" SAS HDD)	24 x 1.8" SATA SSD; 10 x 2.5" HDD: SAS, SATA, NL-SAS, SSD, 4 NVMe PCIe; 8 x 2.5" HDD: SAS, SATA, NL-SAS, SSD	2 × x8 HL/HH x16 + 1 × HL/HH (x16 conn.) (2 CPU); 1 × x16 HL/HH x16 + 1 × .75L/FH (2 CPU); 1 × x16 HL/HH x8 (x16 conn.) + 1 × .75L/FH (1 CPU)	4 × 1 Gb; 2 × 1 GB+ 2 × 10 Gb; 4 × 10 Gb
T630	Tower or 5U Rack	2014	Intel C610	2	Xeon E5-2600 v3 or Xeon E5-2600 v4	1.5 TB	24, DDR4 up to 2400 MT/s	144 TB (18 x 3.5" HDD); 72 TB (32 x 2.5" HDD); 4 Express Flash PCIe SSDs	8 × 3.5" SAS, SATA, NL-SAS, SSD, PCIe SSD drives with optional flex bay; 18 × 3.5" SAS, SATA, NL-SAS, SSD drives; 16 × 2.5" SAS, SATA, NL-SAS, SSD, PCIe SSD drives with optional flex bay; 32 × 2.5" SAS, SATA, NL-SAS, SSD drives	8 PCIe slots: 1. one x16 PCIe 3.0 for FL/FH card from CPU1; 2. one x8 PCIe 2.0 for FL/FH card from PCH (x4 lanes); 3. one x16 PCIe 3.0 for FL/FH card from CPU1; 4. one x8 PCIe 3.0 for HL/FH card from CPU2; 5. one x8 PCIe 2.0 for FL/FH card from CPU2 (x4 lanes); 6. one x16 PCIe 3.0 for FL/FH card from CPU2; 7. one x16 PCIe 3.0 for FL/FH card from CPU2; 8. one x8 PCIe 3.0 for HL/FH card from CPU1 (PERC)	2 × Intel 1GbE LOM
M630	Blade 1/2 height	2014	Intel C610	2	Xeon E5-2600 v3	768 GB	24, DDR4 up to 2133 MT/s		4 × 1.8" SSD; 2 × 2.5" PCIe SSD	2 × PCIe 3.0 (x8) mezzanine	(19 different optional adapters available)
R730	2U Rack	2014	Intel C610	2	Xeon E5-2600 v3 or Xeon E5-2600 v4	3.0 TB	24, DDR4, up to 2400 MT/s	29 TB (16 × 2.5" hot-plug SAS); 64 TB (8 × 3.5" hot-plug NL SAS)	16 × 2.5" SAS, SATA, NL-SAS, SSD; 8 × 3.5" SAS, SATA, NL-SAS, SSD	7 × PCIe 3.0; 1 × PERC	4 × 1 GbE; 2 × 1 GbE + 2 × 10 GbE; 4 × 10 GbE
R730xd	2U Rack	2014	Intel C610	2	Xeon E5-2600 v3	768 GB	24, DDR4 up to 2133 MT/s	99.6 TB (12 × 3.5" NL SAS HDD/SSD + 4 × 3.5" SAS + 2 × 2.5" SAS HDD/SSD); 68.5 TB (18 × 1.8" SATA SSD + 8 × 3.5" SAS HDD); 47.5 TB (24 × 2.5" hot-plug SAS HDD + 2 × 2.5" hot-plug SAS HDD)	16 × 3.5" SAS, SATA, NL-SAS, SSD + 2 × 2.5" drives; 18 × 1.8" SAS, SATA, NL-SAS, SSD drives + 8 × 3.5" SAS, SATA, NL-SAS, SSD drives, + 2 × 2.5" HDD; 26 × 2.5" SAS, SATA, NL-SAS, SSD, PCIe SSD drives	6 × PCIe 3.0; 1 × PERC	4 × 1 Gb; 2 × 1 GB+ 2 × 10 Gb; 4 × 10 Gb
R830	2U Rack	2016	Intel C612	4	Xeon E5-4600 v4	3 TB	24, DDR4 up to 2400 MT/s	61.4 TB (16 × 2.5" SSD)	16 × 2.5" SAS, SATA, NL-SAS, SSD drives	7 × PCIe 3.0; 1 × PERC	4 × 1 Gb; 2 × 1 GB+ 2 × 10 Gb; 4 × 10 Gb
FC830	2U Rack	2016	Intel C612	4	Xeon E5-4600 v4	1.5 TB	48, DDR4 up to 2400 MT/s		16 × 1.8" SSD or; 8 × 2.5" SSD	4-8 × PCIe 3.0 (x8); 1 × PERC	4 × 1 Gb; 2 × 1 GB+ 2 × 10 Gb; 4 × 10 Gb
R930	4U Rack	2015	Intel C602J	4	Xeon E7-4800 v4	12 TB	DDR4 up to 2400 MT/s Only with daughterboards	99.6 TB (12 × 3.5" NL SAS HDD/SSD + 4 × 3.5" SAS + 2 × 2.5" SAS HDD/SSD); 68.5 TB (18 × 1.8" SATA SSD + 8 × 3.5" SAS HDD); 47.5 TB (24 × 2.5" hot-plug SAS HDD + 2 × 2.5" hot-plug SAS HDD)	16 × 3.5" SAS, SATA, NL-SAS, SSD + 2 × 2.5" drives; 18 × 1.8" SAS, SATA, NL-SAS, SSD drives + 8 × 3.5" SAS, SATA, NL-SAS, SSD drives, + 2 × 2.5" HDD; 26 × 2.5" SAS, SATA, NL-SAS, SSD, PCIe SSD drives	6 × PCIe 3.0; 1 × PERC	4 × 1 Gb; 2 × 1 GB+ 2 × 10 GB; 4 × 10 Gb
C4130	1U Rack	2016	Intel C612	2	Xeon E5 2600 v4	1 TB	16, DDR4 up to 2400MT/s		Up to 4 × 2.5" Drives with Tray	2 × PCIe 3.0 low profile Intel H OmniPath	
Model	Chassis	Year	Chipset	CPU (No.)	CPU (Type)	RAM (Max)	RAM (Type)	Internal Storage (Max)	Drive bays	PCI(e) 3.0 slots	On board network

== Generation 14 ==
In July 2017 Dell EMC introduced their 14th generation servers, adding support for latest Intel Xeon Scalable Processors, better NVMe support and other updates.

Model	Chassis	Year	Chipset	CPU (No.)	CPU (Type)	RAM (Max)	RAM (Type)	Internal storage (Max)	Drive bays	PCI(e) 3.0 slots	On board network
R240	1U Rack	2018		1		64 GB	4, DDR4 up to 2666 MT/s		4 x 3.5 SAS, SATA, or SSD		2 x 1 GbE LOM
R340	1U Rack	2018	Intel C246	1	Xeon E-2200 and E-2100 product family, Intel Core i3, Intel Pentium, Intel Celeron	64 GB	4, DDR4 up to 2666 MT/s		8 x 2.5 SAS, SATA, or SSD; 4 x 3.5 SAS, SATA, or SSD	1 x16 slot PCIe Gen3 for HL/FH, 1 x 8 slot PCIe Gen3 for LP	2 x 1 GbE LOM
T340	Tower or 5U Rack	2017	Intel C246	1	Xeon E-2200 and E-2100 product family, Intel Core i3, Intel Pentium, Intel Celeron	64 GB	4, DDR4 up to 2666 MT/s		8 x 3.5" SAS/SATA (HDD/SSD); 8 x 2.5" SAS/SATA(HDD/SDD)(with hybrid drive carrier)	1x8 Gen3 (x16 connector) FH/HL; 1x8 Gen3 (x8 connector) FH/HL; 1x4 Gen3 (x8 connector) FH/HL; 1x1 Gen3 (x1 connector) FH/HL	2 X 1 GbE LOM
R440	1U Rack	2017		2	Xeon; Bronze 31xx or Silver 41xx or Gold 51xx, 61xx	1TB Max (768 GB max memory is recommended for performance optimized configurations)	16, DDR4 up to 2666 MT/s	64 TB (4 x 3.5" hot-plug SAS/SATA HDD/SSD); 76.8 TB (10 x 2.5" hot-plug SAS/SATA HDD/SSD + 4 x NVMe SSD)	2 x M.2 SSD; 4 x 3.5" SAS, SATA, NL-SAS, SSD; 8 x 2.5" SAS, SATA, NL-SAS, SSD; 10 x 2.5" SAS, SATA, NL-SAS, SSD; 10 x 2.5" SAS, SATA, NL-SAS, SSD + 4 NVMe SSD	1 x PCIe 3.0 (FH/HL riser); 2 x PCIe 3.0 (HH/HL riser)	2 x 1 GbE LOM; 2 x 10 GbE SFP+; 2 x 10 GbE
T440	Tower or 5U Rack	2017		2	Xeon; Bronze 3[12]xx or Silver 4[12]xx or Gold 5[12]xx, up to 135 W	512 GB	16, DDR4 up to 2666MT/s	96 TB (8 x 3.5" hot-plug SAS/SATA HDD/SSD); 61 TB (16 x 2.5" hot-plug SAS/SATA HDD/SSD)	2 x M.2 SSD; 4 x 3.5" SAS, SATA, NL-SAS, SSD; 8 x 3.5" SAS, SATA, NL-SAS, SSD; 16 x 2.5" SAS, SATA, NL-SAS, SSD	5	2 x 1 Gb
T640	Tower or 5U Rack	2017	Intel C620	2	1st and 2nd Generation Intel Xeon Scalable, up to 205 W	3 TB	24, DDR4 up to 2666MT/s	216 TB; 61 TB; 122 TB; 112 TB	8 or 18 x 3.5” SAS/SATA (HDD/SSD) max 216 TB; 16 x 2.5” SAS/SATA (HDD/SSD) max 61 TB; 32 x 2.5” SAS/SATA (HDD/SSD) max 122 TB; 16 x 2.5 SAS/SATA (HDD/SSD) + 8 × NVMe SSD max 112 TB	Up to 8 PCIe Gen 3	2 x 10 Gb
R540	2U Rack	2017	Intel C620	2	Intel Xeon scalable Bronze 31xx or Silver 41xx or Gold 51xx or Gold 61xx	1 TB Max (768 GB max memory is recommended for performance optimized configurations)	16, DDR4 up to 2666 MT/s	196 TB max	Up to 12 x 3.5” SAS/SATA HDD max 168 TB; Up to 2 x 3.5 SAS/SATA HDD max 28 TB	Up to 6 PCIe	2 x 1GGbE LOM; 2 x 10 GbE SFP+; 2 x 10 GbE
R640	1U Rack	2017	Intel C620	2	1st and 2nd Generation Intel Xeon Scalable, up to 205 W	3 TB RDIMM, 7.68 TB DCPMM	24, DDR4 up to 2933 MT/s	max 76.8 TB	Front: up to 10 x 2.5” SAS/SATA (HDD/SSD) max 7.68 TB; up to 10 NVMe drives max 64 TB; up to 4 x 3.5” SAS/SATA, max 64 TB; Rear: Up to 2 x 2.5” SAS/SATA (HDD/SSD), NVMe SSD max 15.36 TB	3 (x16/x16/x16)	4 x 1 GbE; 2 x 10 GbE + 2 x 1 GbE; 4 x 10 GbE; 2 x 25 GbE
R6415	1U Rack	2017		1	1st Generation AMD Epyc	1 TB RDIMM	16, DDR4 up to 2666MT/s	max 76.8 TB	Front: up to 10 x 2.5” SAS/SATA (HDD/SSD); up to 10 NVMe drives; up to 4 x 3.5” SAS/SATA	2 (x16/x16)	2 x 1 Gb Base-T; 2 x 10Gb Base-T; 2 x 10Gb SPF+; 2 x 25Gb SPF+
R740	2U Rack	2017	Intel C620	2	1st and 2nd Generation Intel Xeon Scalable, up to 205 W	3 TB RDIMM, 7.68 TB DCPMM	24, DDR4 up to 2933 MT/s	Up to 16 x 2.5" SAS/SATA; 8 x 3.5" SAS/SATA			4 x 1 GbE; 2 x 10 GbE + 2 x 1 GbE; 4 x 10 GbE; 2 x 25 GbE
R740XD	2U Rack	2017	Intel C620	2	Intel Xeon scalable	3 TB	24, DDR4 up to 2666 MT/s	Front: NVMe SSD max 153 TB or SAS/SATA HDD max 144 TB; Mid Bay: max 48 TB; Rear: max 25 TB	Front: 12 x 3.5" SAS/SATA; Front: 24 x 2.5” SAS/SATA; Rear: Up to 2 x 3.5” SAS/SATA; Rear: Up to 4 x 2.5" SAS/SATA		4 x 1 GbE; 2 x 10 GbE + 2 x 1 GbE; 4 x 10 GbE; 2 x 25 GbE
R940	3U Rack	2017		4	Intel Xeon Gold/Platinum	6 TB	48, DDR4 up to 2666 MT/s	184.32 TB max	24 x 2.5” SAS/SATA (HDD/SSD)		4 × 1 GbE; 4 × 10 GbE; 2 × 10 GbE + 2 × 1 GbE; 2 × 25 GbE
M640	Blade 1/2 height			2	2nd Generation Xeon Scalable	2 TB	16, DDR4 up to 2933 MT/s	12.8 TB max	2 x 2.5” SAS/SATA (HDD/SSD)		2 × 10 GbE + 4 × 1 GbE; 4 × 10 GbE
FC640	1U	2019		2	2nd Generation Xeon Scalable	2 TB	16, DDR4 up to 2933 MT/s	12.8 TB	2 x 2.5” SAS/SATA (HDD/SDD)		2 x 10 GbE + 2 x 1 GbE; 4 x 10 GbE
C6420	2U Rack	2017									
Model	Chassis	Year	Chipset	CPU (No.)	CPU (Type)	RAM (Max)	RAM (Type)	Internal storage (Max)	Drive bays	PCI(e) 3.0 slots	On board network

== Generation 15 ==
On March 17, 2021, Dell officially launched their 15th generation PowerEdge servers with some models already available in 2019.

Model	Chassis	Year	Chipset	CPU (No.)	CPU (Type)	RAM (Max)	RAM (Type)	Internal storage (Max)	Drive bays	PCIe 3.0/4.0 slots	On board network
R6515	1U Rack	2019		1	2nd and 3rd generation AMD EPYC	2 TB	16, DDR4-3200, 8 channels	32 TB	4 × 3.5" (LFF); 8 × 2.5" (SFF)	0–2	2× 1GE; 2× 10GE SFP+; 2× 25GE SFP28
R6525	1U Rack	2019		2	2nd and 3rd generation AMD EPYC	4 TB	32, DDR4-3200, 16 channels	32 TB	4 × 3.5" (LFF); 8 × 2.5" (SFF)	0–2	2× 1GE; 2× 10GE SFP+; 2× 25GE SFP28
R7515	2U Rack	2019		1	2nd and 3rd generation AMD EPYC	2 TB	16, DDR4-3200, 8 channels	112 TB	8–14 × 3.5" (LFF); 24 × 2.5" (SFF)	0–4	2× 1GE; 2× 10GE SFP+; 2× 25GE SFP28
R7525	2U Rack	2019		2	2nd and 3rd generation AMD EPYC	4 TB	32, DDR4-3200, 16 channels	112 TB	8–12 × 3.5" (LFF); 26 × 2.5" (SFF); 2 × M.2 SATA via BOSS S2 card	0–8	2× 1GE; 2× 10GE SFP+; 2× 25GE SFP28
R750	2U Rack	May 2021		2	3rd generation Intel Xeon Scalable(up to 40 cores per processor)	RDIMM 2 TB; or LRDIMM 8 TB	32, DDR4-3200, 16 channels	192 TB; 430 TB	12 × 3.5"; 28 × 2.5"	0–8	2× 1GE
R250	1U Rack	November 2021		1	Intel Xeon series E-2300 or Intel Pentium	128 GB	32, DDR4-3200 (DDR4-2666Mhz for Intel Pentium Processor), 4 channels	30.72 TB; 15.36 TB	4 × 3.5"; 2 × 3.5"	0-2	2× 1GE; Ability to add a network card
R350	1U Rack	November 2021		1	Intel Xeon series E-2300 or Intel Pentium	128 GB	32, DDR4-3200 (DDR4-2666Mhz for Intel Pentium Processor), 4 channels	64 TB; 128 TB	4 × 3.5"; 8 × 2.5"	0-3	2× 1GE; Ability to add a network card
R450	1U Rack	2021		2	3rd generation Intel Xeon Scalable (Up to 24 cores per processor)	1 TB	64, DDR4-2933, 16 channels	64 TB; 61,4 TB	4 × 3.5"; 8 × 2.5"	1-2	2× 1GE; Ability to add a network card
R550	2U Rack	2021		2	3rd generation Intel Xeon Scalable (Up to 24 cores per processor)	1 TB	64, DDR4-2933, 16 channels	128 TB; 61,44 TB; 122,88 TB	8 × 3.5"; 8 × 2.5"; 16 × 2.5"	1-3	2× 1GE; Ability to add a network card
C6525	Blade 1/2 width	2019		2	2nd and 3rd generation AMD EPYC	2 TB	16, DDR4-3200, 8 channels		6 × 2.5" (SFF); 2 × M.2 SATA via BOSS riser card	0–2	1× 1GE
XE8545	4U Rack	2021		2	3rd generation AMD EPYC	4 TB	32, DDR4-3200, 16 channels		10 × 2.5" (SFF SAS/SATA); Up to 8 × 2.5" (SFF NVMe)	0–4	2× 1GE; 2× 10GE SFP+; 2× 25GE SFP28
Model	Chassis	Year	Chipset	CPU (No.)	CPU (Type)	RAM (Max)	RAM (Type)	Internal storage (Max)	Drive bays	PCIe 3.0/4.0 slots	On board network

== Generation 16 ==
Dell officially launched their 16th generation PowerEdge servers in the first half of 2023.

Model	Chassis	Year	Chipset	CPU (No.)	CPU (Type)	RAM (Max)	RAM (Type)	Internal storage (Max)	Drive bays	PCIe 4.0/5.0 slots	On board network
R260	1U Rack	2024		1	Intel® Xeon® E Processor	128 GB	32GB UDIMM, 5600MT/s ECC		6 x 2.5" SAS/SATA (46.08TB)		2 x 1 GbE
R360	1U Rack	2024		1	Intel® Xeon® E series processor	128 GB	32GB UDIMM, 5600MT/s ECC		4 x 3.5" SAS/SATA (64 TB)		2 x 1 GbE
R760	2U Rack	2023	Intel C741	2	4th and 5th Gen Intel® Xeon® Scalable Processors	8 TB	32, up to DDR5- 5600 MT/s (5th Gen Intel Xeon) or DDR5- 4800 MT/s (4th Gen Intel Xeon)			Up to 8 x PCIe Gen4 or up to 4 x PCIe Gen5 slots	2 x 1 GbE LOM card (Optional); Support for OCP 3.0 mezzanine card
R760xa	2U Rack	2023		2	4th and 5th Gen Intel® Xeon® Scalable Processors	8 TB	32, up to DDR5- 5600 MT/s (5th Gen Intel Xeon) or DDR5- 4800 MT/s (4th Gen Intel Xeon)		Front Bays: Up to 6 x E3.S Gen5 NVMe; Up to 6 x 2.5-inch NVMe; Up to 8 x 2.5-inch SAS/SATA/NVMe	Up to twelve PCIe slots	2 x 1 GbE LOM card (Optional); Support for OCP 3.0 mezzanine card
R760xd2	2U Rack	2023		2	4th Gen Intel® Xeon® Scalable Processors	1.5 TB	16, up to DDR5- 5600 MT/s (5th Gen Intel Xeon) or DDR5- 4800 MT/s (4th Gen Intel Xeon)		Up to 24 x 3.5-inch SAS/SATA + 4 x 3.5-inch SAS/SATA or 4 x 2.5-inch PCIe NVMe with 3.5-inch carrier adapter or 2 x 2.5-inch NVMe SSD or 4 x E3.S NVMe SSD	Up to five PCIe Slots: 5 x PCIe Gen4 slots	2 x 1 GbE LOM card; Support for OCP 3.0 mezzanine card
R760xs	2U Rack	2023		2	4th and 5th Gen Intel® Xeon® Scalable Processors	1.5 TB	16, up to DDR5- 5600 MT/s (5th Gen Intel Xeon) or DDR5- 4800 MT/s (4th Gen Intel Xeon)		Front Bays: Up to 12 x 3.5-inch SAS/SATA (HDD/SSD); Up to 16 x 2.5-inch SAS/SATA (HDD/SSD); Up to 8 x 2.5-inch NVMe (SSD)	Up to six PCIe slots: 2 x PCIe Gen5 slots; 4 x PCIe Gen4 slots	2 x 1 GbE LOM card; Support for OCP 3.0 mezzanine card
R7615	2U Rack	2023		1	4th Generation AMD EPYC	3 TB	12, up to DDR5- 4800 MT/s		Front Bays: Up to 12 x 3.5-inch SAS/SATA (HDD/SSD); Up to 24 x 2.5-inch SAS/SATA/NVMe (HDD/SSD); Up to 32 x E3.S (NVMe Gen5 )	Up to eight PCIe slots: 4 x PCIe Gen5 slots; 4 x PCIe Gen4 slots	2 x 1 GbE LOM card (Optional); Support for OCP 3.0 mezzanine card
R7625	2U Rack	2023		2	4th Generation AMD EPYC	6 TB	24, up to DDR5- 5600 MT/s		Front Bays: Up to 12 x 3.5-inch SAS/SATA (HDD/SSD); Up to 24 x 2.5-inch SAS/SATA/NVMe; Up to 32 x EDSFF E3.S Gen5 NVMe	Up to eight PCIe slots: 4 x PCIe Gen5 slots; 8 x PCIe Gen4 slots	2 x 1 GbE LOM card (Optional); Support for OCP 3.0 mezzanine card
R860	2U Rack	2023		4	4th Gen Intel® Xeon® Scalable Processors	16 TB	64, up to DDR5- 5600 MT/s		Front Bays: Up to 24 x 2.5-inch SAS/SATA/NVMe (HDD/SSD) drives; Up to 8 x EDSFF E3.S NVMe Gen5 (SSD) drives	Up to eight Gen5 (x16) slots	2 x 1 GbE LOM card (Optional); Support for OCP 3.0 mezzanine card
R960	4U Rack	2023		4	4th Gen Intel® Xeon® Scalable Processors	16 TB	64, up to DDR5- 5600 MT/s		Front Bays: Up to 32 x 2.5-inch SAS/SATA (HDD/SSD) drives; Up to 24 x 2.5-inch NVMe (SSD) drives; Up to 16 x EDSFF E3.S Gen5 NVMe (SSD) drives	Up to twelve Gen5 (x16) slots	2 x 1 GbE LOM card (Optional); Support for OCP 3.0 mezzanine card

== Generation 17 ==
Model	Chassis	Year	Chipset	CPU (No.)	CPU (Type)	RAM (Max)	Ram (Type)	Internal storage (Max)	Drive bays	PCIe 4.0/5.0 slots	On board network
R470	1U Rack	2024		1	One Intel Xeon 6 processor with up to 144 cores per processor	1 TB	16 DDR5 DIMM	122.4TB with E3.S 122.4TB with NVMe SSD	8 EDSFF 8 x 2.5 inch NVMe/SAS/SATA	0-2	OCP NIC card 3.0
R570	2U Rack	2024		1	one Intel® Xeon® 6 6700/6500 processor (E-core or P-core)	1.5 TB	16 DDR5 DIMM	288 TB	12 x 3.5-inch SAS (HDD)		OCP NIC card 3.0
R670	1U Rack	2024		2	Two Intel Xeon 6 Processors with up to 144 cores per processor	2 TB	32 DDR5 DIMM	122.4TB with E3.S 245.6TB with NVMe SSD	8 EDSFF 8 x 2.5 inch NVMe/SAS/SATA	0-2	OCP NIC card 3.0
R770	2U Rack	2024		2	Two Intel Xeon 6 Processor with up to 144 cores per processor	8 TB	32 DDR5 DIMM 6400 MT/s	244.8TB with E3.S 245.6TB with NVMe SSD	8 or 16 EDSFF 8 or 16 NVMe/SAS/SATA	0-4	OCP NIC card 3.0

== PowerEdge SC Value Servers ==
Independent from the main generations of servers a value line was produced.

Model	Chassis	Year	Chipset	CPU (No. & Socket)	CPU (Type)	RAM (Max)	RAM (Type)	Drive bays	Comments
300 SC	Tower		Intel 440BX		Pentium III	1 GB	4, ECC reg PC-100		
1400 SC	Tower	2000		2	Pentium III	2 GB	4, ECC reg PC-133	Ultra3 SCSI controller	
500 SC	Tower	2001	ServerWorks ServerSet LE 3.0	1	Pentium III 1.0+ or Celeron 800Mhz+	2 GB	4, ECC PC-133		
1500 SC	Tower			2	Pentium III 1.1 GHz	4 GB	4, ECC reg PC-133	6 hot-swappable Ultra3 SCSI HDD bays	
600 SC	Tower	2003	ServerWorks GC-SL	1	Pentium 4 2.0+ or Celeron 1.7+	4 GB	4, ECC DDR 200		
1600 SC	Tower	2004	ServerWorks GC-SL	2	Xeon at up to 3.2 GHz	4 GB	4, ECC DDR 266		
420 SC	Tower	2004	Intel E7221	1	Pentium 4 or Celeron	4 GB	4, ECC DDR2 400–533		
1420 SC	Tower	2004	Intel E7520	2 Socket 604	Xeon, 800Mhz FSB	8 GB	6, ECC DDR2-400	(3) internal 3.5" (2) 5.25 external up to 4 HDD	
1425 SC	1U Rack		Intel E7520	2	Xeon, 800Mhz FSB	12 GB	6, ECC DDR2 400	up to 4 HDD	
430 SC	Tower	2005	Intel E7230	1 LGA 775	Pentium 4 or Celeron D	4 GB	4, ECC DDR2 533	(2) ext. 5.25" (1) ext. 3.5" (2) int. 3.5"	
1430 SC	Tower	2006	Intel 5000V	2 LGA 771	Xeon 5300, Xeon 5100, Xeon 5000	16 GB	4, ECC DDR2 533-667 MHz	4 3.5" SAS or SATA	
1435 SC	1U Rack	2007	Broadcom HT-2100 and HT-1000	2 Socket F	Opteron 2200 or 2300	32 GB	8, ECC DDR2 667	1 slimline bay	
440 SC	Tower	2006	Intel 3000 MCH	1 LGA 775	Xeon 3000, Pentium D or Celeron D	8 GB	4, ECC DDR2 533–667	(2) ext. 5.25" (1) ext. 3.5" (2) int. 3.5"	Although Dell's literature says the max RAM is 4 GB, several people have had success running it with 8 GB RAM total
