= Dell PERC =

A Dell PowerEdge RAID Controller, or Dell PERC, is a series of RAID, disk array controllers made by Dell for its PowerEdge server computers. The controllers support SAS and SATA hard disk drives (HDDs) and solid-state drives (SSDs).

== PERC versions ==
=== Series 5 family ===
These are compatible with 9th and 10th Generation Dell PowerEdge servers.

- PERC 5/E – external
- PERC 5/I – internal – integrated or adapter

=== Series 6 family ===
These are compatible with 10th and 11th Generation Dell PowerEdge servers.

- PERC S100 – software based
- PERC 6/E – external – adapter
- PERC 6/I – internal – modular or adapter

=== Series 7 family ===
These are compatible with 10th and 11th Generation Dell PowerEdge servers.

- PERC S300 – software based
- PERC H200 – internal – integrated/adapter or modular
- PERC H700 – internal – integrated/adapter or modular
- PERC H800 – external – adapter

=== Series 8 family ===
These are compatible with 12th Generation Dell PowerEdge servers.

- PERC S110 – software based
- PERC H310 – adapter or mini mono or mini blade
- PERC H710 – internal – adapter or mini mono or mini blade
- PERC H710p – internal – adapter or mini mono or mini blade
- PERC H810 – external

=== Series 9 family ===
These are compatible with 13th Generation Dell PowerEdge servers.

- PERC S130 – software based
- PERC H330 – internal – Adapter – Tower Servers, Mini-Mono- Rack Servers; no battery backup unit (BBU)
- PERC H730 – internal – Adapter – Tower Servers and Secondary Controllers, Mini-Mono- Rack Servers
- PERC H730p – internal
- PERC H830 – external

Note: All PERC 9 series cards support RAID 6 except for the PERC H330.

=== Series 10 family ===
These are compatible with 14th and 15th Generation Dell PowerEdge Servers.

- PERC H840
- PERC H345
- PERC H740p
- PERC H745
- PERC H745p MX

=== Series 11 family ===
These are compatible with 16th Generation Dell PowerEdge Servers.

- PERC H750
- PERC H750 ADAPTER SAS
- PERC H755 ADAPTER
- PERC H755 FRONT SAS
- PERC H755N FRONT NVME
- PERC H755 MX ADAPTER

=== Series 12 family ===
- PERC H965I ADAPTER
- PERC H965I FRONT
- PERC H965I MX
- PERC H965E ADAPTER

== See also ==
- Dell DRAC
- Intel Rapid Storage Technology
- List of Dell PowerEdge Servers
