= List of Intel Xeon processors (Haswell-based) =

== "Haswell-WS" (22 nm) ==
- All models support: MMX, SSE, SSE2, SSE3, SSSE3, SSE4.1, SSE4.2, AVX, AVX2, FMA3, F16C, BMI1 (Bit Manipulation Instructions1), BMI2, Enhanced Intel SpeedStep Technology (EIST), Intel 64, XD bit (an NX bit implementation), TXT, Intel vPro, Intel VT-x, Intel VT-d, Hyper-threading (except E3-1220 v3, E3-1225 v3 and E3-1226 v3), Turbo Boost 2.0, AES-NI, Smart Cache, TSX, ECC, Intel x8 SDDC'
- All models support DDR3-1600 ECC memory.

=== Xeon E3-12xx v3 (uniprocessor) ===
Model number	sSpec number	Cores	Frequency	Turbo	L2 cache	L3 cache	GPU model	GPU frequency	TDP	Socket	I/O bus	Release date	Part number(s)	Release price (USD)
Dual Core, ultra-low power
Xeon E3-1220L v3	SR1BT (C0)	2	1.1 GHz	2/4	2 × 256 KB	4 MB	—N/a	—N/a	13 W	LGA 1150	DMI 2.0	September 2013	CM8064601481914	$193
Quad Core
Xeon E3-1220 v3	SR154 (C0)	4	3.1 GHz	2/3/4/4	4 × 256 KB	8 MB	—N/a	—N/a	80 W	LGA 1150	DMI 2.0	June 2013	CM8064601467204; BX80646E31220V3	$193 $203
Xeon E3-1225 v3	SR14U (C0); SR1KX (C0)	4	3.2 GHz	2/3/4/4	4 × 256 KB	8 MB	HD Graphics P4600	350–1200 MHz	84 W	LGA 1150	DMI 2.0	June 2013	CM8064601466507; BX80646E31225V3; CM8064601466510	$213 $224
Xeon E3-1226 v3	SR1R0 (C0)	4	3.3 GHz	2/3/4/4	4 × 256 KB	8 MB	HD Graphics P4600	350–1200 MHz	84 W	LGA 1150	DMI 2.0	May 2014	CM8064601575206; BX80646E31226V3	$213
Xeon E3-1230 v3	SR153 (C0)	4	3.3 GHz	2/3/4/4	4 × 256 KB	8 MB	—N/a	—N/a	80 W	LGA 1150	DMI 2.0	June 2013	CM8064601467202; BX80646E31230V3	$240 $250
Xeon E3-1231 v3	SR1R5 (C0)	4	3.4 GHz	2/3/4/4	4 × 256 KB	8 MB	—N/a	—N/a	80 W	LGA 1150	DMI 2.0	May 2014	CM8064601575332; BX80646E31231V3	$240
Xeon E3-1240 v3	SR152 (C0)	4	3.4 GHz	2/3/4/4	4 × 256 KB	8 MB	—N/a	—N/a	80 W	LGA 1150	DMI 2.0	June 2013	CM8064601467102; BX80646E31240V3	$262 $273
Xeon E3-1241 v3	SR1R4 (C0)	4	3.5 GHz	2/3/4/4	4 × 256 KB	8 MB	—N/a	—N/a	80 W	LGA 1150	DMI 2.0	May 2014	CM8064601575331; BX80646E31241V3	$262
Xeon E3-1245 v3	SR14T (C0)	4	3.4 GHz	2/3/4/4	4 × 256 KB	8 MB	HD Graphics P4600	350–1200 MHz	84 W	LGA 1150	DMI 2.0	June 2013	CM8064601466509; BX80646E31245V3	$276 $287
Xeon E3-1246 v3	SR1QZ (C0)	4	3.5 GHz	2/3/4/4	4 × 256 KB	8 MB	HD Graphics P4600	350–1200 MHz	84 W	LGA 1150	DMI 2.0	May 2014	CM8064601575205; BX80646E31246V3	$276
Xeon E3-1270 v3	SR151 (C0)	4	3.5 GHz	2/3/4/4	4 × 256 KB	8 MB	—N/a	—N/a	80 W	LGA 1150	DMI 2.0	June 2013	CM8064601467101; BX80646E31270V3	$328 $339
Xeon E3-1271 v3	SR1R3 (C0)	4	3.6 GHz	2/3/4/4	4 × 256 KB	8 MB	—N/a	—N/a	80 W	LGA 1150	DMI 2.0	May 2014	CM8064601575330; BX80646E31271V3	$328
Xeon E3-1275 v3	SR14S (C0)	4	3.5 GHz	2/3/4/4	4 × 256 KB	8 MB	HD Graphics P4600	350–1250 MHz	84 W	LGA 1150	DMI 2.0	June 2013	CM8064601466508; BX80646E31275V3	$339 $350
Xeon E3-1276 v3	SR1QW (C0)	4	3.6 GHz	2/3/4/4	4 × 256 KB	8 MB	HD Graphics P4600	350–1250 MHz	84 W	LGA 1150	DMI 2.0	May 2014	CM8064601575216; BX80646E31276V3	$339
Xeon E3-1280 v3	SR150 (C0)	4	3.6 GHz	2/3/4/4	4 × 256 KB	8 MB	—N/a	—N/a	82 W	LGA 1150	DMI 2.0	June 2013	CM8064601467001	$612
Xeon E3-1281 v3	SR1R2 (C0); SR21F (C0)	4	3.7 GHz	2/3/4/4	4 × 256 KB	8 MB	—N/a	—N/a	82 W	LGA 1150	DMI 2.0	May 2014	CM8064601575329	$612
Xeon E3-1285 v3	SR14W (C0)	4	3.6 GHz	2/3/4/4	4 × 256 KB	8 MB	HD Graphics P4700	350–1300 MHz	84 W	LGA 1150	DMI 2.0	June 2013	CM8064601466703	$662
Xeon E3-1286 v3	SR1QX (C0)	4	3.7 GHz	2/3/4/4	4 × 256 KB	8 MB	HD Graphics P4700	350–1300 MHz	84 W	LGA 1150	DMI 2.0	May 2014	CM8064601575203	$662
Quad Core, low power
Xeon E3-1265L v3	SR15A (C0)	4	2.5 GHz	6/9/11/12	4 × 256 KB	8 MB	HD Graphics (10 EUs)	350–1200 MHz	45 W	LGA 1150	DMI 2.0	June 2013	CM8064601467406	$294
Xeon E3-1268L v3	SR17Y (C0)	4	2.3 GHz	6/7/9/10	4 × 256 KB	8 MB	HD Graphics P4600	350–1000 MHz	45 W	LGA 1150	DMI 2.0	June 2013	CM8064601484200	$377
Xeon E3-1275L v3	SR1T7 (C0); SR156 (C0)	4	2.7 GHz	6/9/11/12	4 × 256 KB	8 MB	HD Graphics (10 EUs)	350–1200 MHz	45 W	LGA 1150	DMI 2.0	May 2014	CM8064601575224	$328
Xeon E3-1284L v3	SR1U0 (C0)	4	1.8 GHz	?/?/?/14	4 × 256 KB	6 MB	Iris Pro Graphics 5200	750–1000 MHz	47 W	BGA-1364	DMI 2.0	February 2014	CL8064701637600	OEM
Xeon E3-1285L v3	SR14X (C0); SR15B (C0)	4	3.1 GHz	4/5/7/8	4 × 256 KB	8 MB	HD Graphics P4700	350–1250 MHz	65 W	LGA 1150	DMI 2.0	June 2013	CM8064601466804	$774
Xeon E3-1286L v3	SR1QY (C0)	4	3.2 GHz	4/5/7/8	4 × 256 KB	8 MB	HD Graphics P4700	350–1250 MHz	65 W	LGA 1150	DMI 2.0	May 2014	CM8064601575204	$774
Quad Core, ultra-low power
Xeon E3-1230L v3	SR158 (C0)	4	1.8 GHz	6/7/9/10	4 × 256 KB	8 MB	—N/a	—N/a	25 W	LGA 1150	DMI 2.0	June 2013	CM8064601467601	$250
Xeon E3-1240L v3	SR1T8 (C0)	4	2 GHz	6/7/9/10	4 × 256 KB	8 MB	—N/a	—N/a	25 W	LGA 1150	DMI 2.0	May 2014	CM8064601575341	$278

== "Haswell-EN" (22 nm) Entry ==
- All models support: MMX, SSE, SSE2, SSE3, SSSE3, SSE4.1, SSE4.2, AVX, F16C, Enhanced Intel SpeedStep Technology (EIST), Intel 64, XD bit (an NX bit implementation), TXT, Intel VT-x, Intel EPT, Intel VT-d, Intel VT-c, Intel x8 SDDC, Hyper-threading, Turbo Boost (except E5-2408 v3 and E5-2418L v3), AES-NI, Smart Cache.
- Support for up to six DIMMs of DDR3 memory per CPU socket.

=== Xeon E5-14xx v3 (uniprocessor) ===
Model number	sSpec number	Cores	Frequency	Turbo	L2 cache	L3 cache	TDP	Socket	I/O bus	Memory	Release date	Part number(s)	Release price (USD)
Xeon E5-1428L v3	SR234 (M1)	8	2 GHz	2/2/2/2/2/3/5/5	8 × 256 KB	20 MB	65 W	LGA 1356-3	DMI 2.0	3× DDR3-1600	Jan 12, 2015	CM8064301548034	$608

=== Xeon E5-24xx v3 (dual-processor) ===
Model number	sSpec number	Cores	Frequency	Turbo	L2 cache	L3 cache	TDP	Socket	I/O bus	Memory	Release date	Part number(s)	Release price (USD)
Xeon E5-2408L v3	SR236 (R2)	4	1.8 GHz	—N/a	4 × 256 KB	10 MB	45 W	LGA 1356-3	6.4 GT/s QPI	3× DDR3-1333	Jan 12, 2015	CM8064301559301	$256
Xeon E5-2418L v3	SR232 (R2)	6	2 GHz	—N/a	6 × 256 KB	15 MB	50 W	LGA 1356-3	6.4 GT/s QPI	3× DDR3-1333	Jan 12, 2015	CM8064301442740	$472
Xeon E5-2428L v3	SR235 (R2)	8	1.8 GHz	2/2/2/2/2/3/5/5	8 × 256 KB	20 MB	55 W	LGA 1356-3	8.0 GT/s QPI	3× DDR3-1600	Jan 12, 2015	CM8064301559000	$811
Xeon E5-2438L v3	SR233 (M1)	10	1.8 GHz	2/2/2/2/2/2/2/3/5/5	10 × 256 KB	25 MB	70 W	LGA 1356-3	8.0 GT/s QPI	3× DDR3-1600	Jan 12, 2015	CM8064301547350	$1555

== "Haswell-EP" (22 nm) Efficient Performance ==
- All models support: MMX, SSE, SSE2, SSE3, SSSE3, SSE4.1, SSE4.2, AVX, AVX2, FMA3, F16C, Enhanced Intel SpeedStep Technology (EIST), Intel 64, XD bit (an NX bit implementation), Intel VT-x, Intel EPT, Intel VT-d, Hyper-threading (except E5-1603 v3, E5-1607 v3, E5-2603 v3, E5-2609 v3, E5-2628 v3, E5-2663 v3, E5-2685 v3 and E5-4627 v3), Turbo Boost 2.0 (except E5-1603 v3, E5-1607 v3, E5-2603 v3, E5-2608L v3, E5-2609 v3 and E5-4610 v3), AES-NI, Smart Cache.
- Transistors: Up to 8 cores: 2.60 billion, Up to 12 cores: 3.84 billion, Up to 18 cores: 5.69 billion
- Die size: Up to 8 cores: 354 mm^{2}, Up to 12 cores: 492 mm^{2}, Up to 18 cores: 662 mm^{2}
- Support for up to 12 DIMMs of DDR4 memory per CPU socket (E5-2629 v3, 2649 v3 and 2669 v3, E5-2678 v3, also support DDR3 memory).

=== Xeon E5-16xx v3 (uniprocessor) ===
Model number	sSpec number	Cores	Frequency	Turbo	L2 cache	L3 cache	TDP	Socket	I/O bus	Memory	Release date	Part number(s)	Release price (USD)
Quad Core
Xeon E5-1603 v3	SR20K (R2)	4	2.8 GHz	—N/a	4 × 256 KB	10 MB	140 W	LGA 2011-3	DMI 2.0	4× DDR4-1866	Sep 8, 2014	CM8064401548605	$202
Xeon E5-1607 v3	SR20M (R2)	4	3.1 GHz	—N/a	4 × 256 KB	10 MB	140 W	LGA 2011-3	DMI 2.0	4× DDR4-1866	Sep 8, 2014	CM8064401736303	$225
Xeon E5-1620 v3	SR20P (R2)	4	3.5 GHz	1/1/1/1	4 × 256 KB	10 MB	140 W	LGA 2011-3	DMI 2.0	4× DDR4-2133	Sep 8, 2014	CM8064401973600; BX80644E51620V3	$294
Xeon E5-1630 v3	SR20L (R2)	4	3.7 GHz	1/1/1/1	4 × 256 KB	10 MB	140 W	LGA 2011-3	DMI 2.0	4× DDR4-2133	Sep 8, 2014	CM8064401614501	$372
Six Core
Xeon E5-1650 v3	SR20J (R2)	6	3.5 GHz	1/1/1/1/3/3	6 × 256 KB	15 MB	140 W	LGA 2011-3	DMI 2.0	4× DDR4-2133	Sep 8, 2014	CM8064401548111; BX80644E51650V3	$583
Eight Core
Xeon E5-1660 v3	SR20N (R2)	8	3 GHz	3/3/3/3/3/3/5/5	8 × 256 KB	20 MB	140 W	LGA 2011-3	DMI 2.0	4× DDR4-2133	Sep 8, 2014	CM8064401909200	$1080
Xeon E5-1680 v3	SR20H (R2)	8	3.2 GHz	3/3/3/3/3/4/6/6	8 × 256 KB	20 MB	140 W	LGA 2011-3	DMI 2.0	4× DDR4-2133	Sep 8, 2014	CM8064401547809	$1723
Ten Core
Xeon E5-1681 v3	SR1Y2 (M1)	10	2.9 GHz	3/3/3/3/3/3/3/4/6/6	10 × 256 KB	25 MB	135 W	LGA 2011-3	DMI 2.0	4× DDR4-2133	Sep 8, 2014	CM8064401576003	OEM
Twelve Core
Xeon E5-1686 v3	SR1YB (M1)	12	2.6 GHz	2/2/2/2/2/2/2/3/4/5/6/6	12 × 256 KB	30 MB	135 W	LGA 2011-3	DMI 2.0	4× DDR4-2133	Sep 8, 2014	CM8064401725600	OEM
Fourteen Core
Xeon E5-1691 v3	SR1XJ (C1)	14	2.5 GHz	5/5/5/5/5/5/5/5/5/5/6/7/9/9	14 × 256 KB	35 MB	135 W	LGA 2011-3	DMI 2.0	4× DDR4-2133	Sep 8, 2014	CM8064401575939	OEM

=== Xeon E5-26xx v3 (dual-processor) ===
Model number	sSpec number	Cores	Frequency	Turbo	L2 cache	L3 cache	TDP	Socket	I/O bus	Memory	Release date	Part number(s)	Release price (USD)
Quad Core
Xeon E5-2623 v3	SR208 (R2)	4	3 GHz	3/3/5/5	4 × 256 KB	10 MB	105 W	LGA 2011-3	2× 8.0 GT/s QPI	4× DDR4-1866	Sep 8, 2014	CM8064401832000	$444
Xeon E5-2637 v3	SR202 (R2)	4	3.5 GHz	1/1/2/2	4 × 256 KB	15 MB	135 W	LGA 2011-3	2× 9.6 GT/s QPI	4× DDR4-2133	Sep 8, 2014	CM8064401724101	$996
Six Core
Xeon E5-2603 v3	SR20A (R2)	6	1.6 GHz	—N/a	6 × 256 KB	15 MB	85 W	LGA 2011-3	2× 6.4 GT/s QPI	4× DDR4-1600	Sep 8, 2014	CM8064401844200; BX80644E52603V3	$213
Xeon E5-2608L v3	SR21P (R2); SR20B (R2)	6	2 GHz	—N/a	6 × 256 KB	15 MB	50 W	LGA 2011-3	2× 6.4 GT/s QPI	4× DDR4-1866	Sep 8, 2014	CM8064402033500; CM8064401909500	$441
Xeon E5-2609 v3	SR1YC (M1)	6	1.9 GHz	—N/a	6 × 256 KB	15 MB	85 W	LGA 2011-3	2× 6.4 GT/s QPI	4× DDR4-1600	Sep 8, 2014	CM8064401850800; BX80644E52609V3	$306
Xeon E5-2620 v3	SR207 (R2)	6	2.4 GHz	2/3/4/5/8/8	6 × 256 KB	15 MB	85 W	LGA 2011-3	2× 8.0 GT/s QPI	4× DDR4-1866	Sep 8, 2014	CM8064401831400; BX80644E52620V3	$417
Xeon E5-2643 v3	SR1XQ (M1); SR204 (R2)	6	3.4 GHz	2/2/2/2/3/3	6 × 256 KB	20 MB	135 W	LGA 2011-3	2× 9.6 GT/s QPI	4× DDR4-2133	Sep 8, 2014	CM8064401440408; CM8064401724501	$1552
Eight Core
Xeon E5-2618L v3	SR200 (R2)	8	2.3 GHz	2/3/4/5/6/7/11/11	8 × 256 KB	20 MB	75 W	LGA 2011-3	2× 8.0 GT/s QPI	4× DDR4-1866	Sep 8, 2014	CM8064401610301	$779
Xeon E5-2622 v3	SR1ZZ (R2)	8	2.4 GHz	2/3/4/5/6/7/10/10	8 × 256 KB	20 MB	85 W	LGA 2011-3	2× 8.0 GT/s QPI	4× DDR4-1866	Sep 8, 2014	CM8064401576904	OEM
Xeon E5-2628 v3	SR201 (R2)	8	2.5 GHz	3/3/3/3/3/3/5/5	8 × 256 KB	20 MB	85 W	LGA 2011-3	2× 9.6 GT/s QPI	4× DDR4-2133	Sep 8, 2014	CM8064401613200	OEM
Xeon E5-2629 v3	SR1XY (M1)	8	2.4 GHz	2/2/2/2/2/2/8/8	8 × 256 KB	20 MB	85 W	LGA 2011-3	2× 8.0 GT/s QPI	4× DDR3-1866; 4× DDR4-1866	Sep 8, 2014	CM8064401547010	OEM
Xeon E5-2630 v3	SR206 (R2)	8	2.4 GHz	2/2/2/2/2/2/8/8	8 × 256 KB	20 MB	85 W	LGA 2011-3	2× 8.0 GT/s QPI	4× DDR4-1866	Sep 8, 2014	CM8064401831000; BX80644E52630V3	$667
Xeon E5-2630L v3	SR209 (R2)	8	1.8 GHz	3/4/5/6/7/8/11/11	8 × 256 KB	20 MB	55 W	LGA 2011-3	2× 8.0 GT/s QPI	4× DDR4-1866	Sep 8, 2014	CM8064401832100	$612
Xeon E5-2640 v3	SR205 (R2)	8	2.6 GHz	2/2/3/4/5/6/8/8	8 × 256 KB	20 MB	90 W	LGA 2011-3	2× 8.0 GT/s QPI	4× DDR4-1866	Sep 8, 2014	CM8064401830901; BX80644E52640V3	$939
Xeon E5-2667 v3	SR203 (R2)	8	3.2 GHz	2/2/2/2/2/2/4/4	8 × 256 KB	20 MB	135 W	LGA 2011-3	2× 9.6 GT/s QPI	4× DDR4-2133	Sep 8, 2014	CM8064401724301	$2057
Ten Core
Xeon E5-2628L v3	SR1XZ (M1)	10	2 GHz	2/2/2/2/2/2/2/3/5/5	10 × 256 KB	25 MB	75 W	LGA 2011-3	2× 8.0 GT/s QPI	4× DDR4-1866	Sep 8, 2014	CM8064401547200	$1364
Xeon E5-2649 v3	SR1XX (M1)	10	2.3 GHz	3/3/3/3/3/3/4/5/7/7	10 × 256 KB	25 MB	105 W	LGA 2011-3	2× 9.6 GT/s QPI	4× DDR3-1866; 4× DDR4-2133	Sep 8, 2014	CM8064401546913	OEM
Xeon E5-2650 v3	SR1YA (M1)	10	2.3 GHz	3/3/3/3/3/3/4/5/7/7	10 × 256 KB	25 MB	105 W	LGA 2011-3	2× 9.6 GT/s QPI	4× DDR4-2133	Sep 8, 2014	CM8064401723701; BX80644E52650V3	$1166
Xeon E5-2652 v3	SR1XT (M1)	10	2.3 GHz	3/3/3/3/3/3/3/3/5/5	10 × 256 KB	25 MB	105 W	LGA 2011-3	2× 9.6 GT/s QPI	4× DDR4-2133	Sep 8, 2014	CM8064401545112	OEM
Xeon E5-2660 v3	SR1XR (M1)	10	2.6 GHz	3/3/3/3/3/3/4/5/7/7	10 × 256 KB	25 MB	105 W	LGA 2011-3	2× 9.6 GT/s QPI	4× DDR4-2133	Sep 8, 2014	CM8064401446117; BX80644E52660V3	$1445
Xeon E5-2663 v3	SR1Y4 (M1)	10	2.8 GHz	3/3/3/3/3/3/4/5/7/7	10 × 256 KB	25 MB	105 W	LGA 2011-3	2× 9.6 GT/s QPI	4× DDR4-2133	Sep 8, 2014	CM8064401612900	OEM
Xeon E5-2666 v3	SR1Y7 (M1)	10	2.9 GHz	3/3/3/3/3/3/3/4/6/6	10 × 256 KB	25 MB	135 W	LGA 2011-3	2× 9.6 GT/s QPI	4× DDR3-1866; 4× DDR4-2133	Nov 13, 2014	CM8064401675902	OEM for Amazon
Xeon E5-2687W v3	SR1Y6 (M1)	10	3.1 GHz	1/1/1/1/1/1/1/2/4/4	10 × 256 KB	25 MB	160 W	LGA 2011-3	2× 9.6 GT/s QPI	4× DDR4-2133	Sep 8, 2014	CM8064401613502; BX80644E52687V3	$2141
Twelve Core
Xeon E5-2648L v3	SR1XW (M1)	12	1.8 GHz	3/3/3/3/3/3/3/3/4/5/7/7	12 × 256 KB	30 MB	75 W	LGA 2011-3	2× 9.6 GT/s QPI	4× DDR4-2133	Sep 8, 2014	CM8064401546007	$1544
Xeon E5-2650L v3	SR1Y1 (M1)	12	1.8 GHz	3/3/3/3/3/3/3/3/4/5/7/7	12 × 256 KB	30 MB	65 W	LGA 2011-3	2× 9.6 GT/s QPI	4× DDR4-2133	Sep 8, 2014	CM8064401575702	$1329
Xeon E5-2658 v3	SR1XV (M1)	12	2.2 GHz	3/3/3/3/3/3/3/3/4/5/7/7	12 × 256 KB	30 MB	105 W	LGA 2011-3	2× 9.6 GT/s QPI	4× DDR4-2133	Sep 8, 2014	CM8064401545904	$1832
Xeon E5-2658A v3	SR27T (M1)	12	2.2 GHz	2.9 GHz	12 × 256 KB	30 MB	105 W	LGA 2011-3	2× 9.6 GT/s QPI	4× DDR4-2133	Q1 2015	CM8064402331600	1832.00
Xeon E5-2669 v3	SR1XU (M1)	12	2.3 GHz	3/3/3/3/3/3/3/4/5/6/8/8	12 × 256 KB	30 MB	120 W	LGA 2011-3	2× 9.6 GT/s QPI	4× DDR3-1866; 4× DDR4-2133	Sep 8, 2014	CM8064401545710	OEM
Xeon E5-2670 v3	SR1XS (M1)	12	2.3 GHz	3/3/3/3/3/3/3/4/5/6/8/8	12 × 256 KB	30 MB	120 W	LGA 2011-3	2× 9.6 GT/s QPI	4× DDR4-2133	Sep 8, 2014	CM8064401544801; BX80644E52670V3	$1589
Xeon E5-2673 v3	SR1Y3 (M1)	12	2.4 GHz	3/3/3/3/3/3/3/3/4/5/7/7	12 × 256 KB	30 MB	105 W	LGA 2011-3	2× 9.6 GT/s QPI	4× DDR3-1866; 4× DDR4-2133	Sep 8, 2014	CM8064401610200	OEM for Microsoft
Xeon E5-2676 v3	SR1Y5 (M1)	12	2.4 GHz	3/3/3/3/3/3/3/3/3/4/6/6	12 × 256 KB	30 MB	120 W	LGA 2011-3	2× 9.6 GT/s QPI	4× DDR3-1866; 4× DDR4-2133	June, 2015	CM8064401613101	OEM for Amazon
Xeon E5-2678 v3	SR20Z (M1)	12	2.5 GHz	4/4/4/4/4/4/4/4/5/6/8/8	12 × 256 KB	30 MB	120 W	LGA 2011-3	2× 9.6 GT/s QPI	4× DDR3-1866; 4× DDR4-2133	2015	CM8064401967500	OEM
Xeon E5-2680 v3	SR1XP (M1)	12	2.5 GHz	4/4/4/4/4/4/4/4/5/6/8/8	12 × 256 KB	30 MB	120 W	LGA 2011-3	2× 9.6 GT/s QPI	4× DDR4-2133	Sep 8, 2014	CM8064401439612; BX80644E52680V3	$1745
Xeon E5-2685 v3	SR1Y9 (M1)	12	2.6 GHz	2/2/2/2/2/2/2/3/4/5/7/7	12 × 256 KB	30 MB	120 W	LGA 2011-3	2× 9.6 GT/s QPI	4× DDR4-2133	Sep 8, 2014	CM8064401684201	$2090
Xeon E5-2690 v3	SR1XN (M1)	12	2.6 GHz	5/5/5/5/5/5/5/5/6/7/9/9	12 × 256 KB	30 MB	135 W	LGA 2011-3	2× 9.6 GT/s QPI	4× DDR4-2133	Sep 8, 2014	CM8064401439416; BX80644E52690V3	$2090
Xeon E5-2692 v3		12	3 GHz	1/1/1/1/1/1/1/1/2/3/6/6	12 × 256 KB	30 MB	165 W	LGA 2011-3	2× 9.6 GT/s QPI	4× DDR4-2133	Sep 8, 2014		OEM for Microsoft
Xeon E5-2693 v3 (ES)	QEYL (L0)	12	2.8 GHz	3/3/3/3/3/3/3/3/3/4/5/6	12 × 256 KB	30 MB	160 W	LGA 2011-3	2× 9.6 GT/s QPI	4× DDR4-2133	Unreleased		-
Fourteen Core
Xeon E5-2683 v3	SR1XH (C1)	14	2 GHz	5/5/5/5/5/5/5/5/5/6/7/8/10/10	14 × 256 KB	35 MB	120 W	LGA 2011-3	2× 9.6 GT/s QPI	4× DDR4-2133	Sep 8, 2014	CM8064401609728	$1846
Xeon E5-2695 v3	SR1XG (C1)	14	2.3 GHz	5/5/5/5/5/5/5/5/5/6/7/8/10/10	14 × 256 KB	35 MB	120 W	LGA 2011-3	2× 9.6 GT/s QPI	4× DDR4-2133	Sep 8, 2014	CM8064401438110; BX80644E52695V3	$2424
Xeon E5-2697 v3	SR1XF (C1)	14	2.6 GHz	5/5/5/5/5/5/5/5/5/6/7/8/10/10	14 × 256 KB	35 MB	145 W	LGA 2011-3	2× 9.6 GT/s QPI	4× DDR4-2133	Sep 8, 2014	CM8064401807100; BX80644E52697V3	$2702
Sixteen Core
Xeon E5-2675 v3	SR1XM (C1)	16	1.8 GHz	2/2/2/2/2/2/2/2/2/2/2/2/2/3/5/5	16 × 256 KB	40 MB	110 W	LGA 2011-3	2× 9.6 GT/s QPI	4× DDR4-2133	Sep 8, 2014	CM8064401845300	OEM
Xeon E5-2698 v3	SR1XE (C1)	16	2.3 GHz	5/5/5/5/5/5/5/5/6/7/8/9/10/11/13/13	16 × 256 KB	40 MB	135 W	LGA 2011-3	2× 9.6 GT/s QPI	4× DDR4-2133	Sep 8, 2014	CM8064401609800	$3226
Xeon E5-2698A v3	SR21C (C1)	16	2.8 GHz	3.2 GHz	16 × 256 KB	40 MB	165 W	LGA 2011-3	2× 9.6 GT/s QPI	4× DDR4-2133	Nov 18, 2014		OEM for Lenovo
Xeon E5-2698B v3	SR21T (C1)	16	2 GHz	4/4/4/4/4/4/5/6/7/8/9/10/11/12/14/14	16 × 256 KB	40 MB	135 W	LGA 2011-3	2× 9.6 GT/s QPI	4× DDR3-1866; 4× DDR4-2133	Jan, 2015	CM8064401843802	OEM for Microsoft
Eighteen Core
Xeon E5-2686 v3	SR1XL (C1)	18	2 GHz	3/3/3/3/3/3/3/6/7/8/9/10/11/12/13/14/15/15	18 × 256 KB	45 MB	120 W	LGA 2011-3	2× 9.6 GT/s QPI	4× DDR3-1866; 4× DDR4-2133	Sep 8, 2014	CM8064401676000	OEM
Xeon E5-2696 v3	SR1XK (C1)	18	2.3 GHz	5/5/5/5/5/5/5/5/6/7/8/9/10/11/12/13/15/15	18 × 256 KB	45 MB	145 W	LGA 2011-3	2× 9.6 GT/s QPI	4× DDR3-1866; 4× DDR4-2133	Sep 8, 2014	CM8064401610101	OEM
Xeon E5-2699 v3	SR1XD (C1)	18	2.3 GHz	5/5/5/5/5/5/5/5/5/5/6/7/8/9/10/11/13/13	18 × 256 KB	45 MB	145 W	LGA 2011-3	2× 9.6 GT/s QPI	4× DDR4-2133	Sep 8, 2014	CM8064401739300	$4115

=== Xeon E5-46xx v3 (quad-processor) ===
Model number	sSpec number	Cores	Frequency	Turbo	L2 cache	L3 cache	TDP	Socket	I/O bus	Memory	Release date	Part number(s)	Release price (USD)
Six Core
Xeon E5-4655 v3	SR22R (M1)	6	2.9 GHz	1/1/1/1/2/2	6 × 256 KB	30 MB	135 W	LGA 2011-3	2× 9.6 GT/s QPI	4× DDR4-2133	June 1, 2015	CM8064402018600	$4616
Ten Core
Xeon E5-4610 v3	SR22S (C1)	10	1.7 GHz	—N/a	10 × 256 KB	25 MB	105 W	LGA 2011-3	2× 6.4 GT/s QPI	4× DDR4-1600	June 1, 2015	CM8064402018800	$1219
Xeon E5-4620 v3	SR22K (C1)	10	2 GHz	2/2/2/2/2/2/3/4/6/6	10 × 256 KB	25 MB	105 W	LGA 2011-3	2× 8.0 GT/s QPI	4× DDR4-1866	June 1, 2015	CM8064401442401	$1668
Xeon E5-4627 v3	SR22Q (M1)	10	2.6 GHz	4/4/4/4/4/4/4/4/6/6	10 × 256 KB	25 MB	135 W	LGA 2011-3	2× 8.0 GT/s QPI	4× DDR4-2133	June 1, 2015	CM8064401544203	$2225
Twelve Core
Xeon E5-4640 v3	SR22L (C1)	12	1.9 GHz	2/2/2/2/2/2/2/3/4/5/7/7	12 × 256 KB	30 MB	105 W	LGA 2011-3	2× 8.0 GT/s QPI	4× DDR4-1866	June 1, 2015	CM8064401442601	$2859
Xeon E5-4648 v3	SR26R (C1)	12	1.7 GHz	2/2/2/2/2/2/2/2/2/3/5/5	12 × 256 KB	30 MB	105 W	LGA 2011-3	2× 8.0 GT/s QPI	4× DDR4-1866	June 1, 2015	CM8064402019100	$2405
Xeon E5-4650 v3	SR22J (C1)	12	2.1 GHz	3/3/3/3/3/3/3/3/4/5/7/7	12 × 256 KB	30 MB	105 W	LGA 2011-3	2× 9.6 GT/s QPI	4× DDR4-2133	June 1, 2015	CM8064401441008	$2838
Fourteen Core
Xeon E5-4660 v3	SR22P (C1)	14	2.1 GHz	3/3/3/3/3/3/3/3/3/4/5/6/8/8	14 × 256 KB	35 MB	120 W	LGA 2011-3	2× 9.6 GT/s QPI	4× DDR4-2133	June 1, 2015	CM8064402018700	$4727
Sixteen Core
Xeon E5-4667 v3	SR22N (C1)	16	2 GHz	3/3/3/3/3/3/3/3/3/3/4/5/6/7/9/9	16 × 256 KB	40 MB	135 W	LGA 2011-3	2× 9.6 GT/s QPI	4× DDR4-2133	June 1, 2015	CM8064401864200	$5729
Eighteen Core
Xeon E5-4669 v3	SR22M (C1)	18	2.1 GHz	3/3/3/3/3/3/3/3/3/3/3/3/3/4/5/6/8/8	18 × 256 KB	45 MB	135 W	LGA 2011-3	2× 9.6 GT/s QPI	4× DDR4-2133	June 1, 2015	CM8064401864100	$7007

== "Haswell-EX" (22 nm) Expandable ==
- All models support: MMX, SSE, SSE2, SSE3, SSSE3, SSE4.1, SSE4.2, AVX, AVX2, FMA3, F16C, Enhanced Intel SpeedStep Technology (EIST), Intel 64, XD bit (an NX bit implementation), Intel VT-x, Intel VT-d, Hyper-threading, Turbo Boost 2.0 (except E7-4809 v3 and 4820 v3), AES-NI, Smart Cache.
- Transistors: Up to 18 cores: 5.69 billion
- Die size: Up to 18 cores: 662 mm^{2}
- Support for up to 24 DIMMs of DDR3 or DDR4 memory per CPU socket.

=== Xeon E7-48xx v3 (quad-processor) ===
Model number	sSpec number	Cores	Frequency	Turbo	L2 cache	L3 cache	TDP	Socket	I/O bus	Memory	Release date	Part number(s)	Release price (USD)
Eight Core
Xeon E7-4809 v3	SR223 (E0)	8	2 GHz	—N/a	8 × 256 KB	20 MB	115 W	LGA 2011-1	3× 6.4 GT/s QPI	4× DDR3-1333; 4× DDR4-1866	May 6, 2015	CM8064501551526	$1223
Ten Core
Xeon E7-4820 v3	SR224 (E0)	10	1.9 GHz	—N/a	10 × 256 KB	25 MB	115 W	LGA 2011-1	3× 6.4 GT/s QPI	4× DDR3-1333; 4× DDR4-1866	May 6, 2015	CM8064502020200	$1502
Twelve Core
Xeon E7-4830 v3	SR222 (E0)	12	2.1 GHz	3/3/3/3/3/3/3/3/3/4/6/6	12 × 256 KB	30 MB	115 W	LGA 2011-1	3× 8.0 GT/s QPI	4× DDR3-1600; 4× DDR4-1866	May 6, 2015	CM8064502020101	$2170
Fourteen Core
Xeon E7-4850 v3	SR221 (E0)	14	2.2 GHz	3/3/3/3/3/3/3/3/3/3/4/4/6/6	14 × 256 KB	35 MB	115 W	LGA 2011-1	3× 8.0 GT/s QPI	4× DDR3-1600; 4× DDR4-1866	May 6, 2015	CM8064501551702	$3003

=== Xeon E7-88xx v3 (octa-processor) ===
Model number	sSpec number	Cores	Frequency	Turbo	L2 cache	L3 cache	TDP	Socket	I/O bus	Memory	Release date	Part number(s)	Release price (USD)
Four Core
Xeon E7-8893 v3	SR226 (E0)	4	3.2 GHz	1/1/3/3	4 × 256 KB	45 MB	140 W	LGA 2011-1	3× 9.6 GT/s QPI	4× DDR3-1600; 4× DDR4-1866	May 6, 2015	CM8064501753602	$6841
Ten Core
Xeon E7-8891 v3	SR225 (E0)	10	2.8 GHz	4/4/4/4/4/4/4/5/7/7	10 × 256 KB	45 MB	165 W	LGA 2011-1	3× 9.6 GT/s QPI	4× DDR3-1600; 4× DDR4-1866	May 6, 2015	CM8064501552202	$6841
Sixteen Core
Xeon E7-8860 v3	SR21Z (E0)	16	2.2 GHz	4/4/4/4/4/4/4/4/4/4/5/6/7/8/10/10	16 × 256 KB	40 MB	140 W	LGA 2011-1	3× 9.6 GT/s QPI	4× DDR3-1600; 4× DDR4-1866	May 6, 2015	CM8064502017900	$4061
Xeon E7-8867 v3	SR228 (E0)	16	2.5 GHz	2/2/2/2/2/2/2/2/2/2/3/4/5/6/8/8	16 × 256 KB	45 MB	165 W	LGA 2011-1	3× 9.6 GT/s QPI	4× DDR3-1600; 4× DDR4-1866	May 6, 2015	CM8064502025001	$4672
Eighteen Core
Xeon E7-8870 v3	SR21Y (E0)	18	2.1 GHz	4/4/4/4/4/4/4/4/4/4/4/4/4/4/5/6/8/8	18 × 256 KB	45 MB	140 W	LGA 2011-1	3× 9.6 GT/s QPI	4× DDR3-1600; 4× DDR4-1866	May 6, 2015	CM8064501550107	$4672
Xeon E7-8880 v3	SR21X (E0)	18	2.3 GHz	3/3/3/3/3/3/3/3/3/3/3/3/3/4/5/6/8/8	18 × 256 KB	45 MB	140 W	LGA 2011-1	3× 9.6 GT/s QPI	4× DDR3-1600; 4× DDR4-1866	May 6, 2015	CM8064501550002	$5895
Xeon E7-8880L v3	SR227 (E0)	18	2 GHz	4/4/4/4/4/4/4/4/4/4/4/4/4/4/5/6/8/8	18 × 256 KB	45 MB	115 W	LGA 2011-1	3× 9.6 GT/s QPI	4× DDR3-1600; 4× DDR4-1866	May 6, 2015	CM8064501552522	$6063
Xeon E7-8890 v3	SR21V (E0)	18	2.5 GHz	4/4/4/4/4/4/4/4/4/4/4/4/4/4/5/6/8/8	18 × 256 KB	45 MB	165 W	LGA 2011-1	3× 9.6 GT/s QPI	4× DDR3-1600; 4× DDR4-1866	May 6, 2015	CM8064501549928	$7174
Xeon E7-8895 v3	SR21W (E0)	18	2.6 GHz	4/4/4/4/6/6/7/7/7/7/8/8/9/9/9/9/9/9	18 × 256 KB	45 MB	175 W	LGA 2011-1	3× 9.6 GT/s QPI	4× DDR3-1600; 4× DDR4-1866	2015	CM8064501615901	OEM for Oracle
