= Dell DRAC =

Out-of-band management platform by Dell

The Dell Remote Access Controller (DRAC) is an out-of-band management platform on certain Dell servers. The platform may be provided on a separate expansion card, or integrated into the main board; when integrated, the platform is referred to as iDRAC.

It mostly uses separate resources to the main server resources, and provides a browser-based and/or command-line interface (CLI) for managing and monitoring the server hardware.

DRAC has similar functionality to the lights out management (LOM) technology offered by other vendors, for example, Sun/Oracle's LOM port, HPE Integrated Lights-Out (iLO), the IBM Remote Supervisor Adapter and Cisco CIMC.

== Features ==
The controller has its own processor, memory, network connection, and access to the system bus. Key features include power management, virtual media access and remote console capabilities, all available through a supported web browser or command-line interface. This gives system administrators the ability to configure a machine as if they were sitting at the local console (terminal).

The DRAC interfaces with baseboard management controller (BMC) chips, and is based on the Intelligent Platform Management Interface (IPMI) 2.0 standard, which allows the use of IPMI out-of-band interfaces such as IPMI Over LAN.

== Versions ==
The Dell Remote Access Controllers (DRAC) and the Integrated Dell Remote Access Controllers (iDRAC) come in different versions, where a new (i)DRAC version is often linked to a new generation of Poweredge servers.

The hardware is often integrated on the motherboard of the server, and the combined product is termed iDRAC, where the "i" is for integrated. When iDRAC Express is used, the software and hardware systems management functions are shared with one of the server's on-board network interfaces using a unique IP address. By contrast, iDRAC Enterprise version features a dedicated physical network interface.

iDRAC version 7 was introduced in conjunction with the release of Dell PowerEdge generation 12 servers in March 2012, and is only available on 12th generation models. Unlike previous versions the functionality of iDRAC 7 is the same for rack, tower and blade-servers.

An overview of the different versions:

Type	Family	Year	Server	Comments
DRAC II	2	1999	—N/a	Extra card
DRAC III	3	2002		
DRAC iV	4	2005	Generation 8	
DRAC 5	5	2006	Generation 9	Extra card, virtual console requires Firefox 1.5
iDRAC 6 embedded	6	2008	First version for blade servers	Integrated on motherboard on all servers
iDRAC 6 Express	6	2008		Standard on all midrange systems
iDRAC 6 Express	6	2008	Blade servers	
iDRAC 6 Enterprise	6	2008		Additional software features in combination with express; vFlash SD card slot
iDRAC 6 Enterprise	6	2008	Blade	Additional software features in combination with express
iDRAC 7	7	2012	Generation 12	New licensing model, hardware based, NTP support, Redfish management
iDRAC 8	8	2014	Generation 13	Quick sync, NFC configuration, UEFI secure boot, HTML5 virtual console, Storage configuration on Supported PERC Cards
iDRAC 9	9	2017	Generations 14, 15, 16	Quick sync 2.0, iDRAC Direct using front Mini-USB Port, New User Interface.
iDRAC 10	10	2025	Generation 17	

== Power management ==
With the DRAC enabled and using its own separate network connection, a user may login and reboot the system even if the core operating system has crashed. If the operating system has loaded the correct drivers, the DRAC will attempt to shut down the system gracefully. Without this feature and with the system running, administrators can use the remote console to access the operating system too.

== Remote console ==
The remote console features of the DRAC allow an administrator to interface with the computer as if sitting in front of it, and one can share the local inputs from keyboard and mouse as well as video output (DRAC does not support remote sound). Remote-console capability relies on either an Active X or Java plug-in, or HTML5 in the later models, which displays a window showing the video output on the local terminal and which takes mouse and keyboard input. This behavior closely resembles that of other remote access solutions such as VNC or RDP but also works if the operating system of the server doesn't work anymore (unlike VNC or RDP). It is used to take the server console remotely.

== Virtual media ==
The DRAC enables a user to mount remotely shared disk-images as if they were connected to the system. In combination with the remote console, this gives administrators the ability to completely re-install an operating system, a task which traditionally required local console access to the physical machine. Administrators can control virtual media through the browser or through the OpenManage tools provided by Dell, though specific versions of browsers restrict some functionality.

== Access ==
The main DRAC management takes place via a web interface. All generations of the DRAC use the default user name root and the default password calvin. Starting with the DRAC 3, Microsoft Active Directory can also provide authentication either with Dell AD Schema Extensions or Standard Schema.

== Implementation ==
The DRAC5 and iDRAC6 and higher are embedded platforms running Linux and Busybox. The firmware source code is available on the Dell website, but it is not possible to compile the source into a replacement firmware as Dell does not include a build environment.

The DRAC provides remote access to the system console (keyboard and screen) allowing the system BIOS to be accessed over the Internet when the server is rebooted. This is done by configuring the system BIOS to send its output to a serial port (as a stream of text using VT100-compatible control codes). The chosen serial port is then redirected to the DRAC's serial port. Users can then log into the DRAC via SSH and run a command to connect the SSH session to the serial port, thus allowing the console to be accessed over the Internet.

Earlier versions of the DRAC used ActiveX in Internet Explorer to provide a remote-console interface in a web browser; however, this was unpopular with non-Windows users who did not have access to Internet Explorer. The latest revision of the DRAC6 uses a Java application instead (launched from within the browser), though both the DRAC5 and iDRAC6 also provided the aforementioned platform-independent SSH access.

== iDRAC6 ==
iDRAC6 is available in two levels: iDRAC6 Express and iDRAC6 Enterprise. iDRAC6 Express (which integrates features previously charged for in DRAC5) became a standard offering on Dell's servers. Certain features are not available for the Express version, including the remote console functionality and the vFlash SD card slot. As with iDRAC, iDRAC6 Enterprise is a standard offering on blade servers

- iDRAC6 offers three upgrades: iDRAC6 Express, iDRAC6 Enterprise, and VFlash Media
- iDRAC6 offers power budgeting
- iDRAC6 Enterprise's virtual console and virtual media features are now integrated into a single plug-in
- iDRAC6 Enterprise's virtual console now allows two users to collaborate on the same server
- iDRAC6 now allows customers to view what is on the server LCD without a server-side visit
- iDRAC6 supports IPv6

== iDRAC7 ==
On 6 March 2012, software version 1.00.00 for the iDRAC7 was released for generation 12 servers. iDRAC 7 does not work on earlier generation servers although some of the new functions introduced with iDRAC 7 might be offered in iDRAC 6 releases. As of May 2019, the current version was 2.63.60.62.

With the introduction of iDRAC 7, the licensing model has changed. iDRAC 7 now supports lifecycle controller. Some features of Lifecycle controller are licensed and to access those features via iDRAC the correct licenses for those functions need to be enabled.

=== Supported hardware platforms ===
iDRAC 7 runs on generation 12 PowerEdge servers. Per introduction in March 2012 the following servers use iDRAC7:

- PowerEdge T620 – tower model of 620, can be converted to 5U rack system
- PowerEdge R220 – native rack server, 1U
- PowerEdge R320 – native rack server, 1U
- PowerEdge R420 – native rack server, 1U
- PowerEdge R520 – native rack server, 2U
- PowerEdge R620 – native rack server, 1U
- PowerEdge M620 – blade server for M1000e enclosure, half-height (max 16 per chassis)
- PowerEdge R720 – rack-server, 2U
- PowerEdge R720xd – an R720 with additional 2.5" hard drive bays in the front and rear of the enclosure

=== Supported operating systems ===
iDRAC 7 is supported by the following operating systems

- Microsoft Windows Server 2016, x64
- Microsoft Windows Server 2012, x64
- Microsoft Windows Server 2008 SP2 (standard, enterprise and datacenter editions), x86 and x64
- Microsoft Windows Server 2008 R2 SP1 (standard, enterprise and datacenter editions), x64
- Microsoft Small Business Server 2011, x64
- SUSE Linux Enterprise Server (SLES) 10 and 11, x64
- Red Hat Enterprise Linux (RHEL), 5.8 (x86/x64), 6.1 (x64) and 6.3 (x64)
- Microsoft Hyper-V (with Windows server 2008) and Hyper-V R2 (Windows Server 2008 R2)
- VMware ESX/ESXi 4.1, Update 2
- VMWare ESXi 5 Patch 01
- Citrix Systems Xen Server 6

=== Supported web browsers ===
The GUI for iDRAC7 uses a Web browser and Java. Internet Explorer 7, 8 and 9, as well as Firefox 6 + 7 were tested for different operating systems.

== Limitations ==
To take advantage of storage greater than 256 MB on the iDRAC6 enterprise, Dell requires that a vFlash SD card be procured through Dell channels. As of December 2011, Dell vFlash SD cards differ from consumer SD cards by being over-provisioned by 100% for increased write endurance and performance.

While there are no other known functional differences between a Dell-branded vFlash SD card and a class 2 or greater SDHC card, the use of non-Dell media prevents the use of extended capacities and functions.

On a Linux client system the standard arrow and print screen keys cannot be used in the iDRAC6 Java virtual console application because of some incompatible key event IDs; however, the arrow keys on the numeric keypad can still be used.

Some combinations of DRAC firmware, web browser, and Java runtime do not support virtual media via the Java applet or the plugin in DRAC5 and iDRAC6.
