= ServerWorks =

Defunct American semiconductor company

ServerWorks Corporation
- Formerly: PRQ; Reliance Computer Corporation
- Industry: Electronics
- Founded: 1994; 32 years ago in Santa Clara, California
- Founder: Raju Vegesna
- Defunct: 2006; 20 years ago
- Fate: Acquired by Broadcom Corporation in 2001; product line discontinued c. May 2006
- Products: Chipsets
- Parent: Broadcom Corporation (2001–2006)

ServerWorks Corporation was an American fabless semiconductor company based in Santa Clara, California, that manufactured chipsets for server computers and workstations running IA-32 microprocessors. Founded as Reliance Computer Corporation in 1994, it filed its initial public offering in the beginning of 2000 and was acquired by Broadcom for nearly US$1 billion.

== History ==
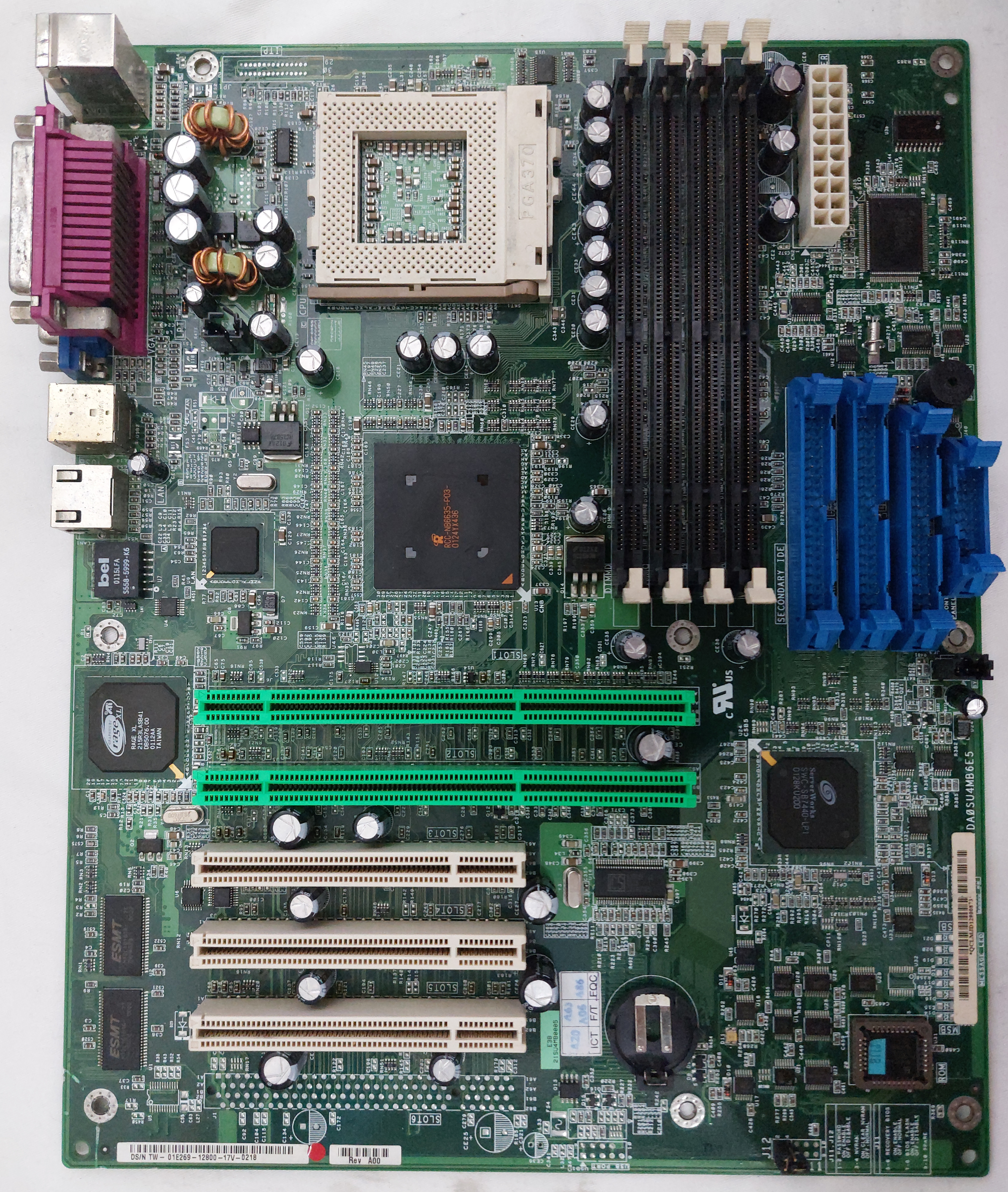
Dell PowerEdge 500SC motherboard with a Reliance-branded ServerSet III northbridge (NB6635, upper right) and ServerWorks-branded southbridge (SB7440, lower right)

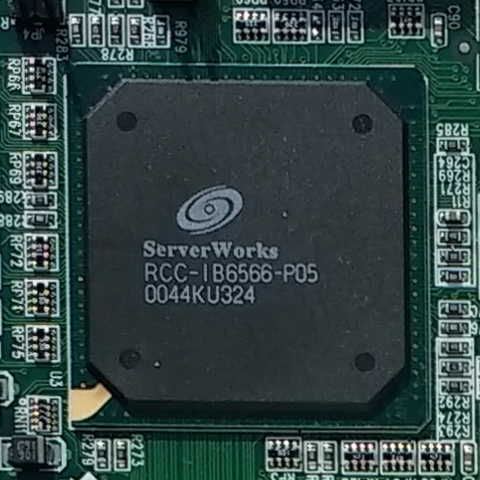
Close up of a Champion 3.0 southbridge (IB6566) on a Supermicro motherboard

Logo of the company doing business as Reliance Computer Corporation

=== 1994–2000: Foundation and growth ===
ServerWorks was founded as PRQ—shortly thereafter Reliance Computer Corporation—in 1994 in Santa Clara, California. The company was founded by Raju Vegesna and two friends of his. Vegesna was named CEO and president; prior to founding Reliance, Vegesna had been employed by Ross Technology, where he was the lead architect behind the hyperSPARC microprocessor. The company was largely funded through Vegesna's personal savings and in its first year only employed 12 people, most of whom bore several disparate job titles. Reliance's first client was Compaq, who employed the company's Champion 1.0 chipset in its Professional Workstation 5100 in 1997. The same chipset was reused by Compaq for three of their ProLiant servers—the 5500, the 3000, and the 1600.

Reliance, which was described as little-known and operating in semi-secrecy to that point, was 60-percent owned by the Fujitsu Corporation of Japan in 1998, after Fujitsu had used Reliance's Champion in its Fujitsu–ICL Teamserver in 1997. Fujitsu shortly after gave Vegesna the contacts to Intel's executives and bankrolled their signing of an agreement for Intel to license out their PCI bus patents to ServerWorks in 1998. By 1999, Reliance had gained NEC, Acer, Dell, IBM, Intergraph, and Siemens as key clients, and in the beginning of 2000, the company changed its name to ServerWorks Corporation.

=== 2000–2003: IPO and acquisition ===
ServerWorks in 2000 employed 85 people; due to its smaller stature, the company was hesitant to consider developing for Intel's forthcoming 64-bit Itanium until the second generation (Itanium 2) had been released. Instead the company would focus squarely on server and workstation chipsets designed around 32-bit x86 (IA-32) microprocessors by Intel, with which ServerWorks signed a 10-year license for Intel's PCI architecture in 1998. As Intel itself was a vendor of server chipsets (at the time, the 840 and the 450NX), ServerWorks was described by the technology press as having a cooperatively competitive relationship to Intel. Of this relationship, Kimball Brown, ServerWorks' president, spoke: "our main competitor is Intel ... but our best customer is Intel, too, and we're helping them sell lots of CPUs". As opposed to Intel's emphasis on raw processing speed, ServerWorks' design philosophy centered on I/O capability.

By the end of 2000, the company employed nearly 100 people, had gone public, sold millions of chips, and reached an annual revenue of roughly $200 million. In January 2001, Broadcom Corporation of Irvine, California, announced its intent to acquire ServerWorks for up to $1.87 billion in stock. This planned acquisition, one among a spree of acquisitions for Broadcom during this time, was described as bucking the trend for Broadcom in The New York Times, as, unlike the struggling companies Broadcom had acquired before, ServerWorks had posted revenue and was profitable. Broadcom finalized the acquisition in mid-January 2001, with the stock swap value lowered to $957 million.

=== 2003–2006: Ousting of founders and dissolution ===
ServerWorks continued to operating as an autonomous subsidiary of Broadcom for the next couple of years. Part of the reason behind Broadcom's hands-off approach was down to legal concerns, as ServerWork's agreement with Intel to license their PCI patents did not extend to Broadcom's own products. ServerWorks' relationship with Intel meanwhile seemed to sour after Broadcom's acquisition, with Intel becoming more competitive in its marketing of its server chipsets. By 2002, however, ServerWorks had a majority share in the server chipset market.

In March 2003, Vegesna and a handful of other executives were ousted by Broadcom. Vegesna was immediately replaced by Duane R. Dickhut. Ashlee Vance of The Register described Broadcom's dismissal of Vegesna as a "public spectacle" through its tersely worded press release, surmising that Vegesna may have asked for too much control of the subsidiary and was not receptive to his higher-ups at Broadcom, with a "fierce boardroom battle" ensuing. The announcement had come one week after ServerWorks had reported a temporary chip shortage for March 2003, following poorer yields than usual of its chipsets. Following a wrongful termination suit filed by Vegesna and the other executives, Broadcom settled out of court, paying them a combined $111 million.

ServerWorks' dominance in the Intel-based server chipset faltered by 2006, when Intel overtook them in market share. The company continued as a functional subsidiary of Broadcom until about May 2006, when Broadcom retired its products from their catalog.

== Chipsets ==
- ServerSet I (a.k.a. Champion 1.0) – featuring two 32-bit PCI buses and supporting up to six Pentium Pro processors; discontinued by the early 2000s
- ServerSet II – featuring one 64-bit PCI bus and supporting up to four Pentium II Xeon processors; discontinued by the early 2000s
- ServerSet III – featuring one 64-bit PCI bus and supporting up to four Pentium III Xeon processors (six with processor-bus modification)
- Champion – available in three variants: Champion LE (Entry) and Champion HE-SL (Volume) supporting up to two Pentium III Xeons with a front-side bus (FSB) clock frequency of 100 MHz; and Champion HE (Enterprise) supporting up to four Pentium III Xeons with an FSB of 133 MHz; the HE-SL and HE come with the CIOB-20 I/O bridge chip; the HE also comes with the MADP memory controller chip
- Grand Champion – available in three variants: Grand Champion SL (Entry) and Grand Champion LE (Volume) supporting up to two Pentium 4–based Xeons with an FSB of 533/400 MHz; and Grand Champion HE (Enterprise) supporting up to four Pentium 4 Xeons with an FSB of 400 MHz
