= Socket 4 =

Component for processors

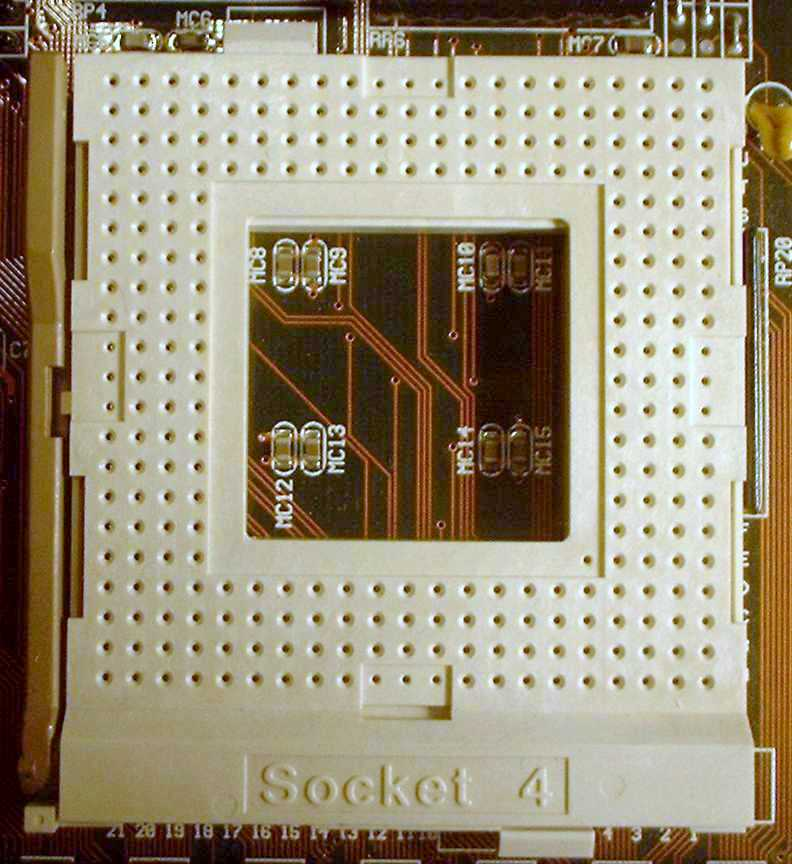
- Type: ZIF
- Chip form factors: PPGA
- Contacts: 273
- FSB protocol: ?
- FSB frequency: 60, 66 MT/s
- Voltage range: 5 V
- Processors: Intel P5 Pentium (60 - 66 MHz); Intel Pentium OverDrive (120 - 133 MHz)
- Predecessor: Socket 3
- Successor: Socket 5
- This article is part of the CPU socket series

Socket 4, presented in 1993, was the first CPU socket designed for the early P5 Pentium microprocessors. Socket 4 was the only 5-volt socket for the Pentium. Socket 4 does support a special Pentium OverDrive, which allows running at 120 MHz (for the 60 MHz Pentium) or 133 MHz (for the 66 MHz Pentium).

Socket 4 was superseded by the 3.3-volt-powered Socket 5 in 1994.

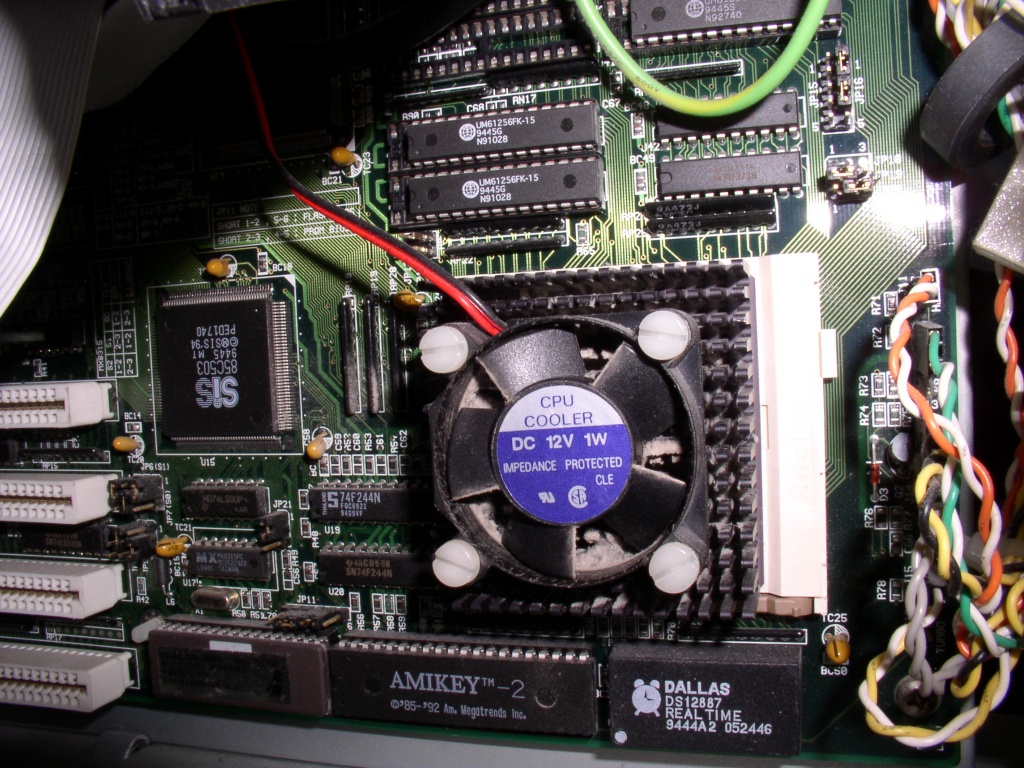
A socket 4 processor mounted on a motherboard

== See also ==
- List of Intel microprocessors
- CPU socket
- Socket 5
- Socket 7
- Pentium (brand)
- Pentium OverDrive
