= List of University of California, Los Angeles people =

This is a list of notable present and former faculty, staff, and students of the University of California, Los Angeles (UCLA).

== Notable alumni ==
=== Nobel laureates ===
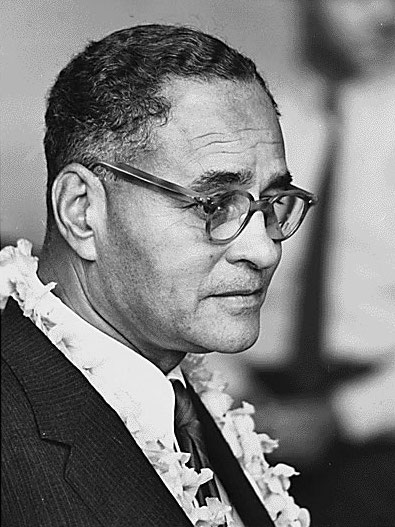
Ralph Bunche in 1963

- Ralph Bunche – recipient of the 1950 Nobel Peace Prize
- Richard F. Heck – recipient of the 2010 Nobel Prize in Chemistry
- Robert Bruce Merrifield – recipient of the 1984 Nobel Prize in Chemistry
- Elinor Ostrom – recipient of the 2009 Nobel Memorial Prize in Economic Sciences
- Ardem Patapoutian – recipient of the 2021 Nobel Prize in Medicine
- Fred Ramsdell – recipient of the 2025 Nobel Memorial Prize in Physiology or Medicine
- Randy Schekman – recipient of the 2013 Nobel Prize in Medicine
- Glenn T. Seaborg – recipient of the 1951 Nobel Prize in Chemistry
- William F. Sharpe – recipient of the 1990 Nobel Memorial Prize in Economic Sciences

=== Academia, science and technology ===
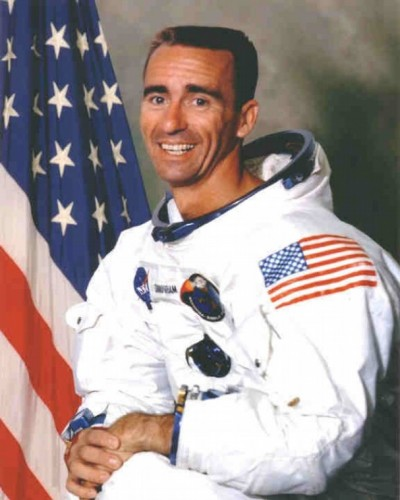
Walt Cunningham, in 1968 NASA's third civilian astronaut

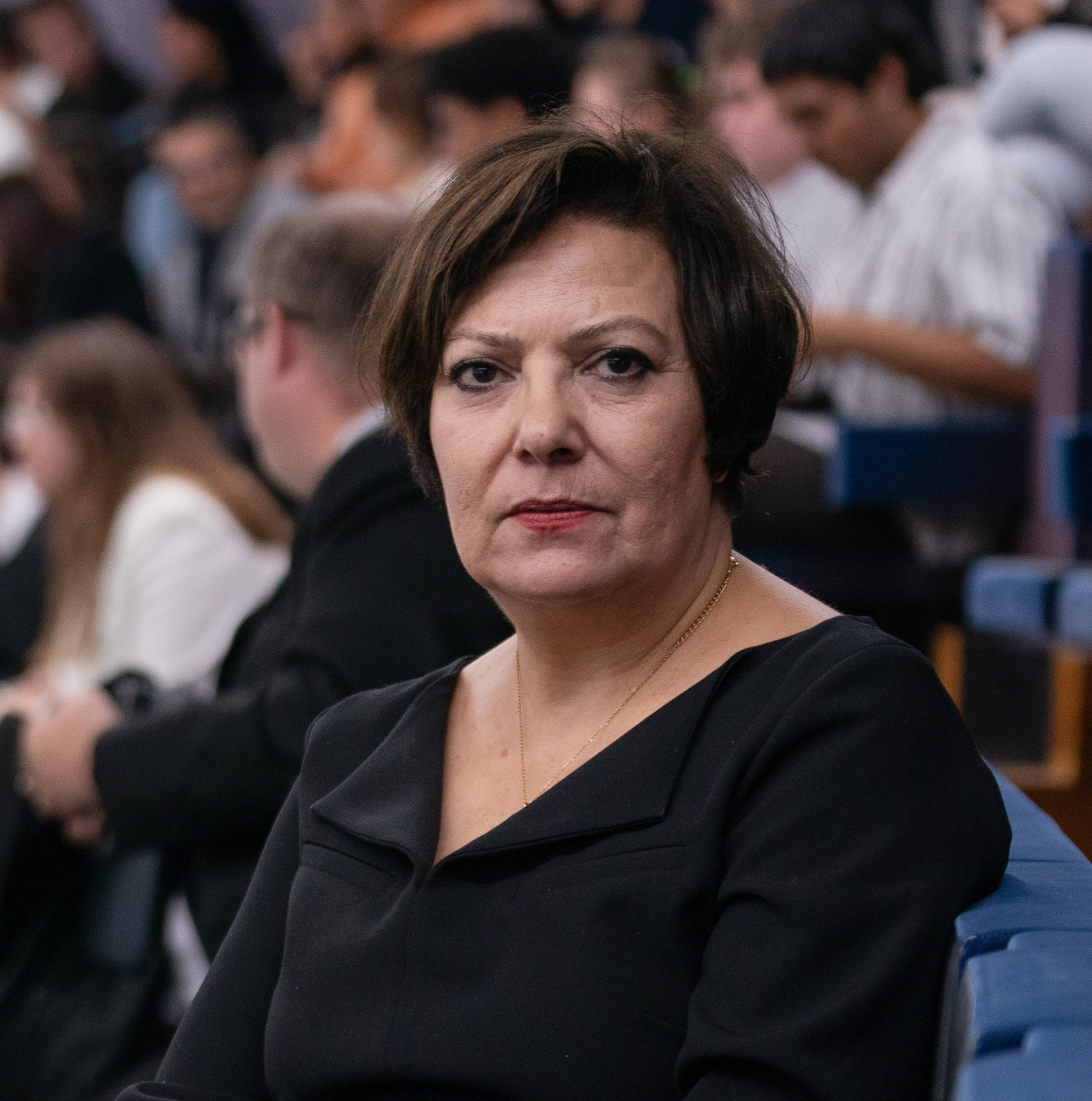
Azadeh Kian (2022) at the European Parliament

- Hutton Ayikwei Addy – professor of Public Health, first dean of the University for Development Studies Medical School
- Allen Adham, B.S. Engineering, 1990 – co-founder, Blizzard Entertainment
- Sara Alpern, M.A. History, 1968 – professor of feminist history, Texas A&M University
- C. Anthony Anderson, Ph.D. Philosophy – professor, University of California, Santa Barbara
- Theresa H. Arriola – Chamorro cultural anthropologist
- William Arveson – mathematician; professor of mathematics, University of California, Berkeley
- Molefi Kete Asante, Ph.D. 1968 – professor of African-American studies, Temple University; founder of the theory of Afrocentricity
- Bernadette Atuahene, B.A. 1997 – property law scholar, James E. Jones Chair at the University of Wisconsin Law School
- June Bacon-Bercey, B.S. 1954, M.S. 1955 – expert on weather; first African-American and first woman to be awarded the American Meteorological Society's Seal of Approval
- Paul Baran, M.S. 1959 – Internet pioneer
- Barry Boehm, M.S. 1961, Ph.D. 1964 – computer scientist; designed the constructive-cost model in software engineering
- Vance Brand, M.B.A. 1964 – astronaut on STS-35, Apollo–Soyuz Test Project, STS-41-B, STS-5
- Nathaniel Branden – psychologist, author, Who is Ayn Rand?, Psychology of Self-Esteem and Judgment Day
- Joanna Brooks, Ph.D. 1999 – literary scholar, professor, author
- Kate Brousseau – chair of the Psychology Department at Mills College, valedictorian of the first graduating class from Los Angeles State Normal School in 1884
- Lara Brown – political scientist and director of The Graduate School of Political Management at the George Washington University
- Angela Bryan B.A. 1992 – professor of Psychology and Neuroscience at the University of Colorado Boulder, health psychologist conducting HIV/STD and cannabis research
- Linda Burhansstipanov – Cherokee Nation of Oklahoma member, public health educator and researcher focused on Native American cancer care and support
- Carlos Castaneda – anthropologist and writer
- Vinton Cerf, M.S. 1970, Ph.D. 1972 – Internet pioneer; recipient of the Turing Award and Presidential Medal of Freedom; frequently called the "father of the Internet"
- Steven N. S. Cheung – former head, School of Economics and Finance, University of Hong Kong
- Francine Coeytaux – women's health worker and abortion rights activist
- Juan Cole – professor of history, University of Michigan
- Steve Crocker, B.A. 1968, Ph.D. 1977 – Internet pioneer
- Walter Cunningham, B.A. 1960, M.A. 1961 – astronaut; Apollo lunar-module pilot, Apollo 7
- Robert Dassanowsky – B.A., M.A., Ph.D. 1992 – CU Distinguished professor of film studies and languages and literatures, University of Colorado Colorado Springs; film and cultural historian; film producer
- Mike Davis – writer and urban theorist; creative-writing professor, University of California, Riverside
- Veronica Della Dora, Ph.D. 2005 – professor of human geography at Royal Holloway, University of London; Fellow of the British Academy
- Keith DeRose, Ph.D. Philosophy – professor, Yale University
- Edward Diller, B.A. 1953 – professor of Germanic languages and literature, University of Oregon
- Kim Yi Dionne, B.A. 1999, M.A. 2007, Ph.D. 2010 – political scientist
- Eliza T. Dresang – M.A. in library and information science
- Glenn S. Dumke, Ph.D. 1942 – historian; chancellor, California State University
- Ramani Durvasula, Ph.D. – clinical psychologist, media expert, and author
- Vernon Dvorak, M.S. 1966 – meteorologist; developed the Dvorak technique
- Katya Echazarreta, electrical engineer, science communicator, and Citizen Astronaut
- Phanuel Egejuru, MA, MPH, PhD – Nigerian writer and academician, Emerita: Loyola Marymount University
- Charles Elachi, M.S. 1983 – director, Jet Propulsion Laboratory
- Thomas Everhart, M.S. 1955 – physicist; former president, California Institute of Technology
- Claude S. Fischer, B.A. 1968 – sociologist; professor of sociology, University of California, Berkeley
- Anna Lee Fisher, B.S. 1971, M.D. 1976 – astronaut
- FM-2030, B.A. 1952 – transhumanist philosopher and author
- Martin Ford, M.B.A. 1991 – futurist and author focusing on artificial intelligence and robotics, winner of the 2015 Financial Times and McKinsey Business Book of the Year Award
- Arthur Furst – toxicologist and cancer researcher
- Biruté Galdikas, B.S. 1966, M.A. 1969, Ph.D. 1978 – primatologist; considered the world's foremost expert in primatology
- Cliff Garrett – entrepreneur and aerospace engineer, founder of Garrett AiResearch
- E. Mark Gold, Ph.D. 1965 – computer scientist
- Louis M. Goldstein, Ph.D. 1977 – professor of linguistics and psychology, Yale University
- Stathis Gourgouris, B.A., M.A., Ph.D. – professor of English and comparative literature at Columbia University
- Nancy Guerra, B.A. – psychologist and dean of the School of Social Ecology at University of California, Irvine
- Elliot Hirshman, M.A. 1984, Ph.D. 1987 – president of San Diego State University
- David Ho – physician and AIDS researcher; 1996 Time Person of the Year
- Ove Hoegh-Guldberg – biologist and climate scientist; expert in effects of climate change on coral reefs
- John Keith Irwin (1929–2010), B.A. – author; professor of sociology, San Francisco State University
- M. Saif Islam – electrical engineer; professor at the University of California, Davis
- Charlie Jackson, B.A. 1972 – co-founder of FutureWave Software, which created Adobe Flash
- Kay Redfield Jamison – writer; psychiatry professor, Johns Hopkins University
- Arthur Janov – psychologist, inventor of primal therapy
- Frede Jensen Ph.D. 1961 – author; Romance philologist; professor of French, University of Colorado at Boulder
- Lewis Judd, MD – neurobiologist and psychiatrist, director of the National Institute of Mental Health, pioneered biomedical study of mental illness, professor at the University of California, San Diego (1977-2013)
- John Junkins – professor and former interim president of Texas A&M University
- Travis Kalanick – co-founder of Uber (dropped out)
- Hildegard Korf Kallmann-Bijl – Ph.D. 1955, Kallmann Atmosphere
- Hans Kamp, Ph.D. Philosophy – professor, University of Stuttgart and University of Texas, Austin
- Maulana Karenga – former chairperson of the black-studies department, California State University, Long Beach; founder of Kwanzaa
- David A. Karnofsky, BA 1934 – physician, medical oncologist, known for the Karnofsky score
- Kenneth Kaushansky – dean of Stony Brook University School of Medicine, physician, former editor-in-chief of Blood, past president of the American Society of Hematology
- Yasuyuki Kawahigashi, Ph.D. 1989 – mathematician; professor at University of Tokyo
- Thomas A. Kennedy, Ph.D. Engineering 1984 – executive chairman, Raytheon Technologies
- Azadeh Kian – social scientist and director of the Centre d’Etudes Feministes, Paris Cité University
- Ed Krupp, Ph.D. 1972 – astronomer; author; director, Griffith Observatory
- Thomas S. Kupper – physician, Thomas B. Fitzpatrick Professor at Harvard Medical School
- Helen Landgarten, B.A 1963 – psychotherapist, art therapy pioneer
- Jim Lanzone – president, CBS Interactive
- Ralph Larkin, Ph.D. 1969 – sociologist
- Jeffrey W. Legro, M.A. 1988, Ph.D. 1992 – political scientist; executive vice president, provost, and professor at the University of Richmond; professor and vice provost for global affairs at the University of Virginia
- Steven Lehrer – medical researcher and writer
- Antony Garrett Lisi – theoretical physicist
- Elizabeth Loftus – psychologist; professor, University of California, Irvine; influential studies on human memory
- Geoffrey Marcy – astronomer; professor of physics and astronomy, University of California, Berkeley
- Gordon Eugene Martin, M.S. 1951 – pioneering piezoelectric materials researcher for underwater sound transducers
- K. Megan McArthur, B.S. 1993 – astronaut, STS-125 shuttle mission to service Hubble Space Telescope
- Patrick McNaughton, B.A. 1966 – art historian, Chancellor Professor of African Art History at Indiana University
- Michael Morhaime, B.S. 1990 – co-founder, Blizzard Entertainment
- Steven Muller – former president, Johns Hopkins University
- Story Musgrave, M.B.A. 1959 – astronaut
- Nathan Myhrvold, B.A., M.S. 1979 – former chief technology officer, Microsoft; board of trustees member, Institute for Advanced Study
- David Nagel, Ph.D. – former president and chief executive officer, PalmSource
- Shrikanth Narayanan – researcher, professor, University of Southern California
- Hugh Nibley, B.A., history – writer and scholar; professor of ancient studies, Brigham Young University
- William H. Okamura, B.S. 1962 – distinguished professor of chemistry at the University of California, Riverside
- Bruce Ovbiagele, M.S. 2009 – physician, academician, author, editor, and hospital leader
- Hagop Panossian – aerospace engineer and academic
- Mary Papazian – president of San Jose State University
- David A. Patterson, A.B. 1960, M.S. 1970, Ph.D. 1976 – professor of computer science, University of California, Berkeley; one of the pioneers of both RISC and RAID
- Frank Pearce, B.S. 1990 – co-founder, Blizzard Entertainment
- John L. Phillips, Ph.D. 1987 – astronaut
- George C. Pimentel, B.S. 1943 – former professor of chemistry, University of California, Berkeley; inventor of the chemical laser; namesake of the George C. Pimentel Award in Chemical Education; namesake of Pimentel Hall, University of California, Berkeley
- Mason Porter – professor of Mathematics, UCLA (2016– )
- Jon Postel, B.S. 1966, M.S. 1968, Ph.D. 1974 – Internet pioneer
- Alvin F. Poussaint – professor of psychiatry, Harvard University
- Hilary Putnam – philosopher of mind, language and mathematics; philosophy professor, Harvard University
- Itamar Rabinovich, PhD – historian, diplomat, and president of Tel Aviv University
- Max Rafferty, B.A. 1938, M.A. 1949 – 22nd California State Superintendent of Public Instruction, education advocate, author, and politician
- Kanury Venkata Subba Rao, post-doctoral research 1985–88 – immunologist, Shanti Swarup Bhatnagar laureate
- Louise Richardson, M.A. 1981 – first female vice-chancellor of both the University of St Andrews and the University of Oxford (the third oldest and oldest university in the English-speaking world, respectively)
- Ahmadreza Rofougaran, B.S. 1986, M.S. 1988, Ph.D. 1998 – pioneer in RF CMOS and mmWave radios
- Jed E. Rose, post-doctoral 1979–1980, Psychophysiology – professor in Psychiatry and Behavioral Sciences, Duke University; co-inventor of the nicotine patch; president and CEO of the Rose Research Center
- Mary Golda Ross, professional engineering certificate, 1949 – first Native American woman engineer
- Christine Rossell, Ph.D. Political Science – professor, Boston University
- Nathan Salmon, Ph.D. Philosophy – professor, University of California, Santa Barbara
- Wesley Salmon, Ph.D. Philosophy – professor, University of Pittsburgh
- Henry Samueli, B.S. 1975, M.S. 1976, Ph.D. 1980 – professor of electrical engineering, University of California, Los Angeles; co-founder of Broadcom Corporation; namesake of the Henry Samueli School of Engineering and Applied Science, UCLA; namesake of the Henry Samueli School of Engineering, University of California, Irvine
- Rakesh Sarin, Paine Chair in Management at the University of California, Los Angeles
- Mark S. Scarberry – professor of law at Pepperdine University School of Law
- Elliot See, M.S. 1962 – astronaut
- Etel Solingen, Ph.D. 1987 – political scientist
- David L. Soltz, Ph.D. 1974 – environmental biologist, president of Bloomsburg University of Pennsylvania
- Esther Somerfeld-Ziskind, M.A. Psychology, 1934 – neurologist and psychiatrist
- Steven Soter, B.S. 1965 – astrophysicist, science writer, co-wrote both Cosmos television series
- Gilbert Strang, Ph.D. 1959 – professor of mathematics, Massachusetts Institute of Technology
- Gary Sullivan, Ph.D. 1991 – researcher and standardization leader in video compression technology including H.264/AVC, HEVC, and DirectX Video Acceleration
- Guido Tabellini, Ph.D. 1984 – rector, Bocconi University, Milan, Italy
- Andrea Talentino, M.A., Ph.D. – ninth president of Augustana College
- David Tannor (born 1958), Ph.D. – theoretical chemist, Hermann Mayer Professorial Chair in the Department of Chemical Physics at the Weizmann Institute of Science
- Richard A. Tapia – mathematician; advocate for under-represented minorities in science education; professor of computational and applied mathematics, Rice University
- Paul Terasaki – organ-transplant medicine and tissue typing
- Michael Albert Thomas – physicist, academic, and clinical researcher
- Marc Tremblay, M.S. 1985, Ph.D. 1991 – chief architect, Sun Microsystems; co-designer of several of its microprocessors
- Hendrik W. (H.W.) van der Merwe, Ph.D. 1963 – founder of the Centre for Intergroup Studies, University of Cape Town
- Marius Vassiliou, M.B.A 1991 – research executive, author, and computational scientist
- Taylor Wang, B.S. 1967, M.S. 1968, Ph.D. 1971 – astronaut; professor of mechanical engineering, Vanderbilt University
- Jessica Watkins, Ph.D. Geology 2015 – astronaut
- Nicole Weekes – psychologist and neuroscientist
- Fred Whipple, B.S. 1927 – astronomer; proposed the dirty snowball theory of the composition of comets; namesake of the Whipple Observatory in Arizona
- Flossie Wong-Staal, B.S. 1968, Ph.D. Molecular Biology 1972 – virology, first to clone HIV
- Susanne Woods – English professor and provost of Wheaton College
- Charles E. Young, M.A. 1957, Ph.D. 1960 – former chancellor, University of California, Los Angeles; former president, University of Florida
- Mani H. Zadeh, B.S. 1994 – surgeon and researcher (sinus surgery)
- Peter Zampardi, Ph.D. – microwave engineer

=== Arts and literature ===
- Amy Adler – artist
- Luis Aguilar-Monsalve – writer and educator
- Lita Albuquerque – artist
- Amadour – artist, writer, musician
- Carmen Argote – artist
- Sara Kathryn Arledge – artist
- Catherine Asaro – Nebula Award-winning science-fiction novelist
- Tony Auth – Pulitzer Prize–winning political cartoonist
- Glenna Avila – artist
- James Robert Baker – novelist
- Gary Baseman – artist
- Edith Baumann – abstract artist
- Rosa Beltrán – writer, lecturer and academic
- Guy Bennett – writer, translator and educator
- Susan Berman – author and screenwriter
- Stan Bitters – sculptor
- Justina Blakeney – designer and author
- Slater Bradley – artist
- Barbara Branden – author
- JaNay Brown-Wood – children's book author
- Kenneth Wayne Bushnell – artist and educator
- Jan Butterfield – art writer and educator
- Bryan Cantley - visionary architect, academic, artist, author
- Vija Celmins – artist
- Judy Chicago – artist and educator
- Vicky A. Clark – curator
- Coleman Collins – artist
- Jennifer Dalton – artist
- Agnes de Mille – dancer and choreographer
- Jacques Ehrmann – literary theorist
- Dan Eldon – photojournalist
- Elliot Engel – writer, dramatist, and lecturer
- Rafa Esparza – artist
- Warren Farrell – educator, gender equality activist, author of The Myth of Male Power
- Alyce Frank – artist
- Martin Friedman – former director of Walker Art Center
- Alice Taylor Gafford – artist
- Charles Garabedian – artist
- Laeh Glenn – visual artist
- Kelly Grovier – poet and literary critic
- Kim Gruenenfelder – author
- Emilie Halpern – artist
- Sam Harris – writer
- Florence Parry Heide – author of children's literature
- Juan Felipe Herrera – professor, 21st U.S. poet laureate
- Gilah Yelin Hirsch – artist
- Diane Johnson – novelist
- Jane Jin Kaisen – artist
- Beth Katleman – sculptor
- Craig Kauffman – artist
- Jonathan Kellerman – Edgar Award-winning novelist and psychologist
- Toba Khedoori – painter
- Annie Lapin – painter
- Mitchell Landsberg – journalist
- Gaylord Larsen – mystery writer
- Joanne Larson – writer
- Russell Leong – author and philosopher of Asian-American studies
- Linda Levi – artist
- Dave McNary – entertainment journalist
- Edward Meshekoff – artist
- Meleko Mokgosi – artist
- Ed Moses – artist
- Alexandra Nechita – painter
- John D. Nesbitt – writer and educator
- Tameka Norris – artist
- Flo Perkins – glass artist
- Perry Picasshoe – multidisciplinary artist
- Raymond Pettibon – visual artist, known for creating the cover art for punk-rock band Black Flag's albums
- Andrew X. Pham – writer
- Jenelle Porter – art curator and author
- Jason Rhoades – artist
- RinRin Doll – model and YouTuber
- Kay Ryan – poet and educator; U.S. Poet Laureate (2008–2010); MacArthur Fellow (2011)
- Betye Saar – artist
- Ben Sakoguchi – artist
- Shizu Saldamando – artist
- Sarah Seager – artist
- Cindy Shih – artist
- Klaus Stimeder – writer and journalist
- Jan Stussy – artist
- Wu Tsang – artist
- Billie Tsien – architect, Barack Obama Presidential Center
- Harry Turtledove – Hugo Award and Nebula Award-winning science-fiction novelist
- Barbara Brooks Wallace – award-winning children's author, including two Edgar Awards and a William Allen White Children's Book Award
- Emma Walton Hamilton (UCLA Lab School) – actress, author of children's book
- Idelle Weber – artist
- Antoine Wilson – novelist
- Jan Wurm – artist
- Richard Wyatt Jr. – artist
- Mindy Seu - Artist
- Eddo Stern - Artist
- Casey Reas - Artist
- Lauren McCarthy - Artist
- Refik Anadol - Artist
- Aidan Strong - Artist

=== Business and entrepreneurship ===
- Nancy J. Adler – professor of Organizational Behavior and Samuel Bronfman Chair in Management at McGill University
- Fred D. Anderson – former CFO of Apple Inc. and co-founder of Elevation Partners
- John Edward Anderson – president of Topa Equities, Ltd.; namesake of UCLA Anderson School of Management
- Tom Anderson – founder of MySpace
- Nancy Austin – management consultant and author of The Assertive Woman
- Stephen F. Bollenbach – served as CEO of Hilton Hotels and CFO for Holiday Inn, Trump Organization, Marriott, Disney
- Saul Brandman – garment manufacturer
- Bernard Briskin – co-founder and chairman of Gelson's Markets
- Lisa Brummel – served as an executive for Microsoft; co-owner, Seattle Storm
- Michael Burns – executive and vice chairman of Lionsgate Entertainment
- Michael Burry – hedge fund manager
- Frieda Rapoport Caplan – entrepreneur in specialty produce
- Frank T. Cary – former chairman and CEO, IBM
- Paul Colichman – founder of Here! cable TV network
- Brian Cornell – chairman and CEO, Target Corporation; chairman, Yum! Brands
- Eric Ellenbogen – co-founded DreamWorks Classics, former CEO of Marvel Enterprises and WildBrain
- Laurence D. Fink – CEO and chairman of BlackRock
- Vanessa Getty – socialite and model
- Marshall Goldsmith – former founding director, Alliance for Strategic Leadership
- Bill Gross – co-founder of PIMCO; philatelist
- Vinita Gupta – first Indian-origin woman to take her company public
- Sam Hamadeh – co-founder, Vault.com
- Jeffrey O. Henley – former executive vice president and CFO, Oracle
- John W. Henry – money manager and principal owner of the Boston Red Sox and Liverpool F.C.
- Nita Ing – chairman of Continental Engineering Corporation and Taiwan High Speed Rail
- William R. Johnson – chief executive officer, H.J. Heinz Company
- Carl Karcher – founder of Carl's Jr. and former president, CKE Restaurants
- Guy Kawasaki – former Chief Evangelist of Apple
- Ryan Lee – hedge fund manager and radio commentator
- Hardy McLain – hedge fund manager; managing partner of CVC Capital Partners
- Irwin Molasky – real estate entrepreneur and early developer of Las Vegas
- Robert S. Murley – chairman of the investment banking of Credit Suisse Securities and Educational Testing Service (ETS)
- Ezri Namvar – former founder and chairman of Namco Capital Group
- Richard G. Newman – former chairman and CEO, AECOM
- Michael Ovitz – Hollywood power broker and former president of the Walt Disney Company
- Robert O. Peterson – founder of the Jack in the Box restaurant chain
- Rose Catherine Pinkney – former executive for 20th Century Fox Television, BET, Paramount Pictures, TV Land, TV One
- David Polak – founded NWQ Investment Management Co.
- Donald Prell – venture capitalist, author and futurist
- Bernardo Quintana – founder of Empresas ICA
- Subramaniam Ramadorai – chief executive officer and managing director, Tata Consultancy Services
- Martine Rothblatt – CEO of United Therapeutics
- Nobutada Saji – chief executive officer, Suntory
- Sanford C. Sigoloff – businessman
- Stacey Snider – president of DreamWorks
- Steven D. Strauss – author, business columnist, and lawyer
- Ronald Sugar – chief executive officer, Northrop Grumman
- Winnie Sun — financial advisor
- Jay Sures – co-president of United Talent Agency
- Vlad Tenev - co-founder/CEO of Robinhood Markets
- Steven F. Udvar-Hazy – founder, chairman and CEO of ILFC
- Surangel Whipps Jr. – president of the Republic of Palau (2021–present)
- Susan Wojcicki – former CEO, YouTube
- Don Yee – NFL sports agent

=== Composers and musicians ===
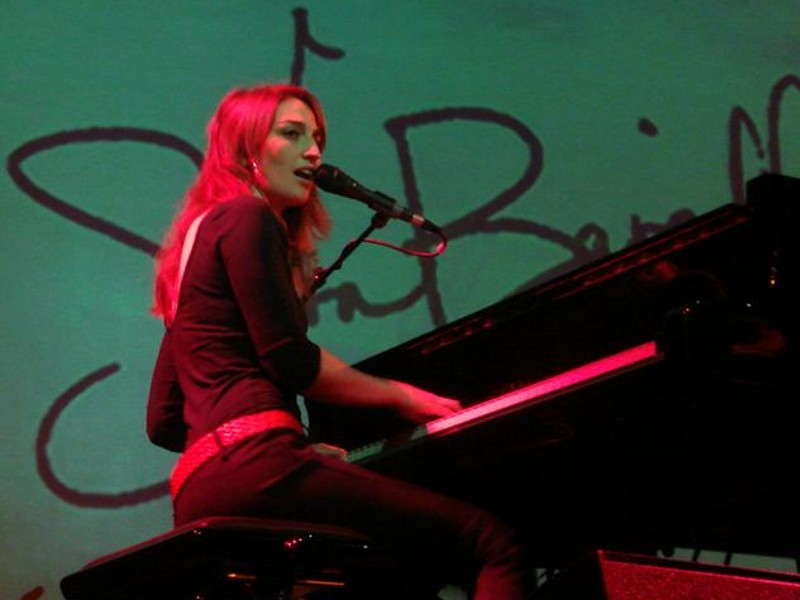
Sara Bareilles, Grammy Award-winning singer-songwriter

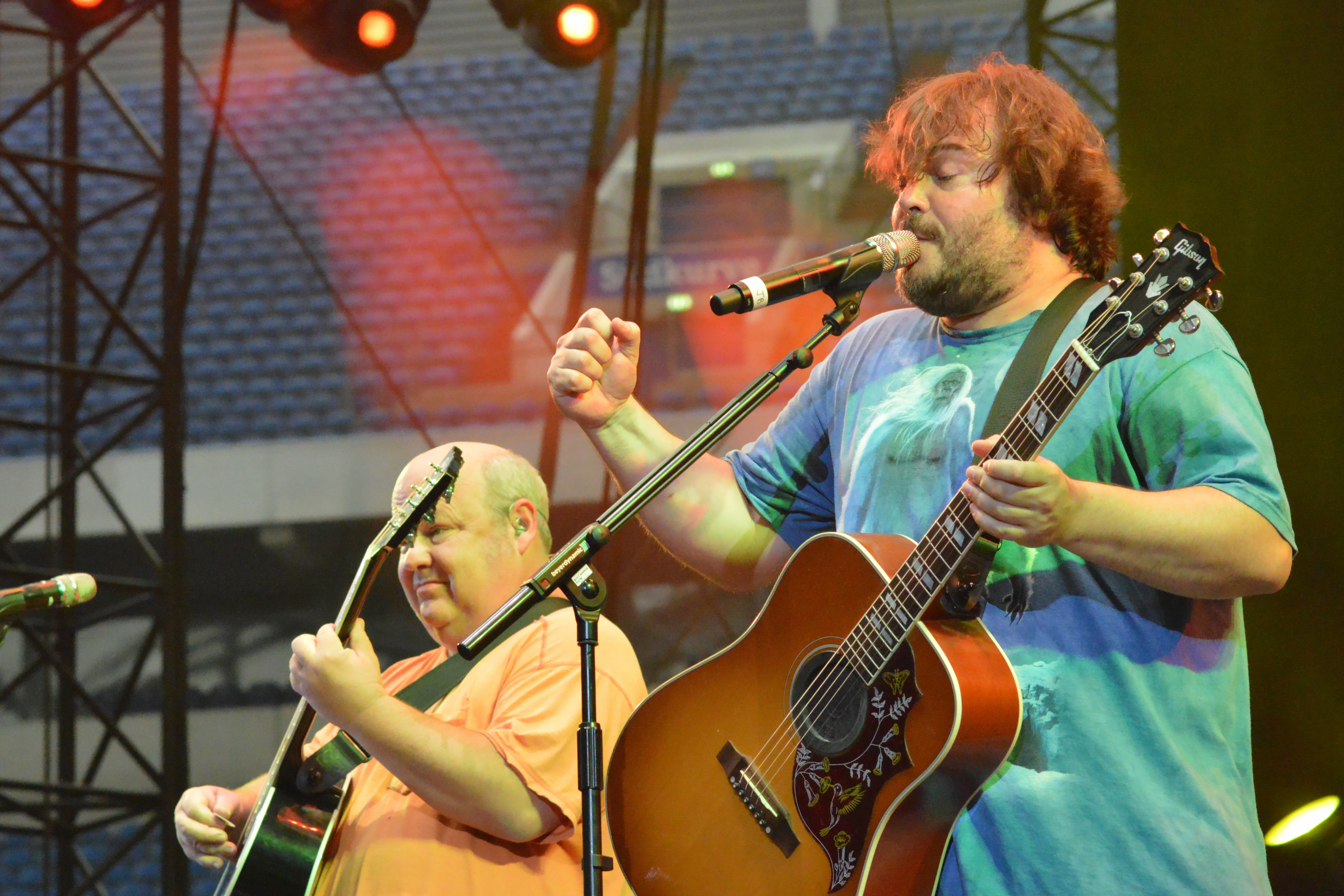
Tenacious D, a Grammy Award-winning comedy band with Jack Black (right) and Kyle Gass (left), both UCLA alumni

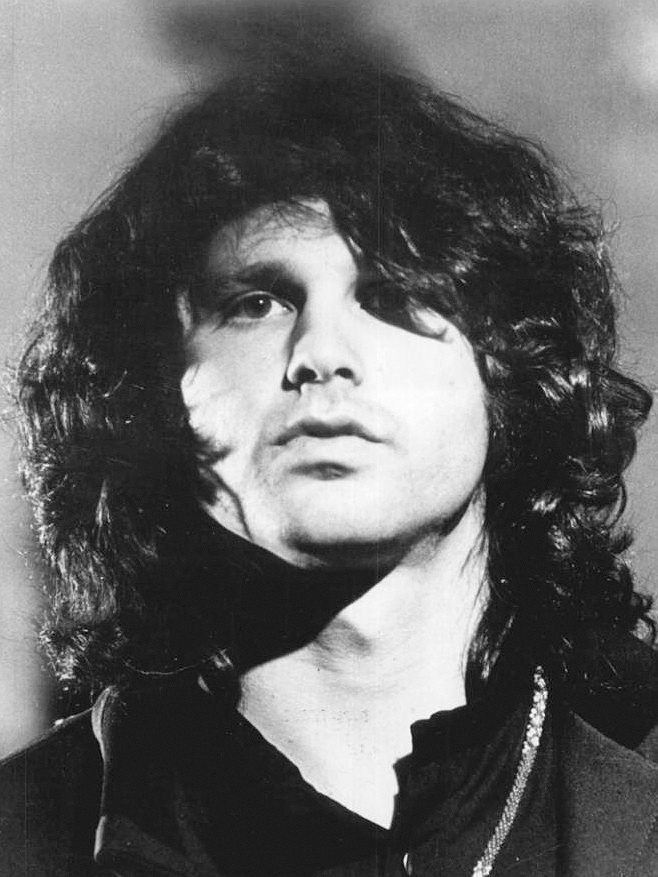
Jim Morrison, co-founder and lead vocalist of rock band The Doors

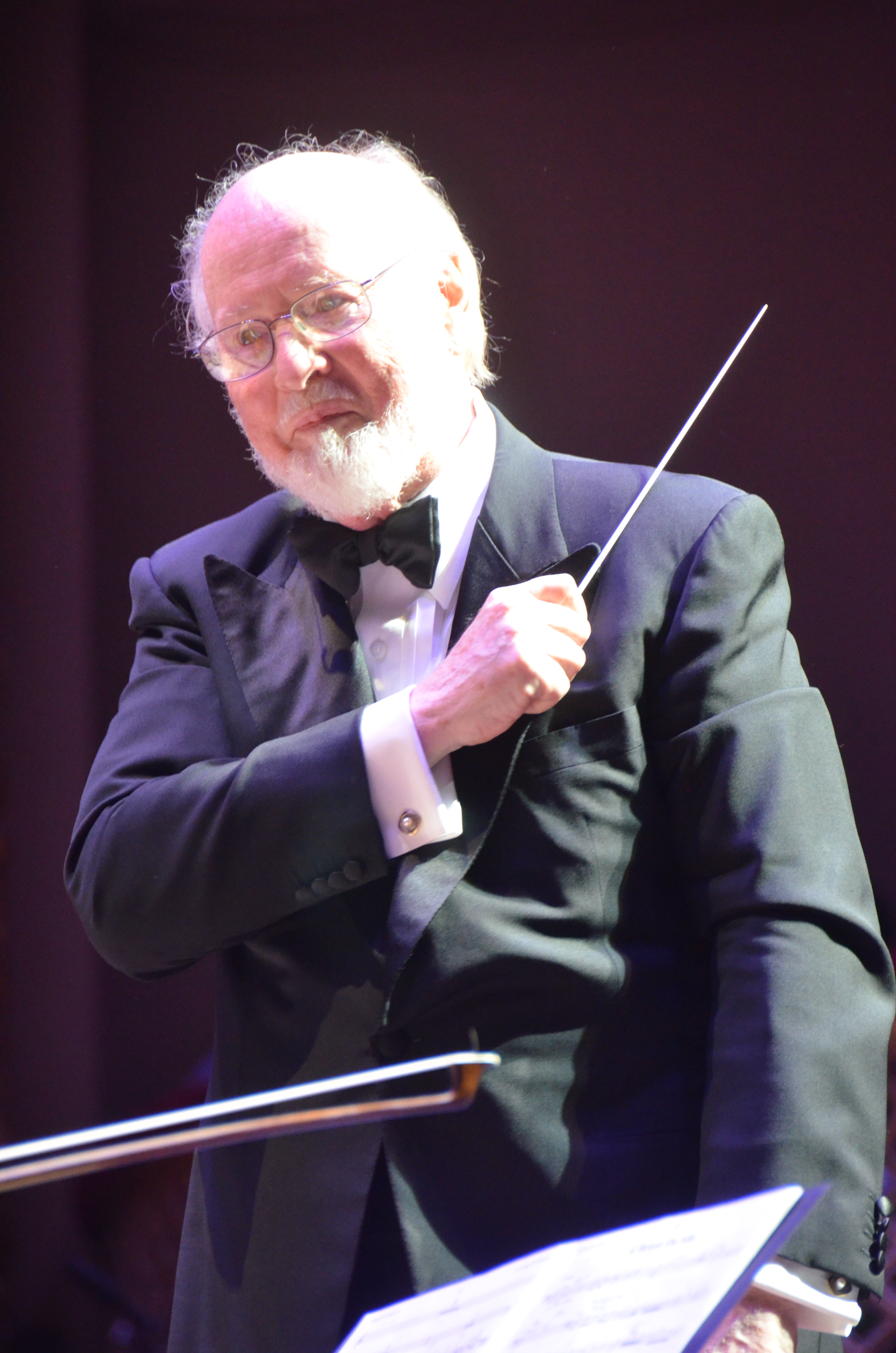
John Williams, Academy Award, Emmy Award and Grammy Award-winning composer; notable film scores for Harry Potter, Indiana Jones, Jurassic Park, and Star Wars film series

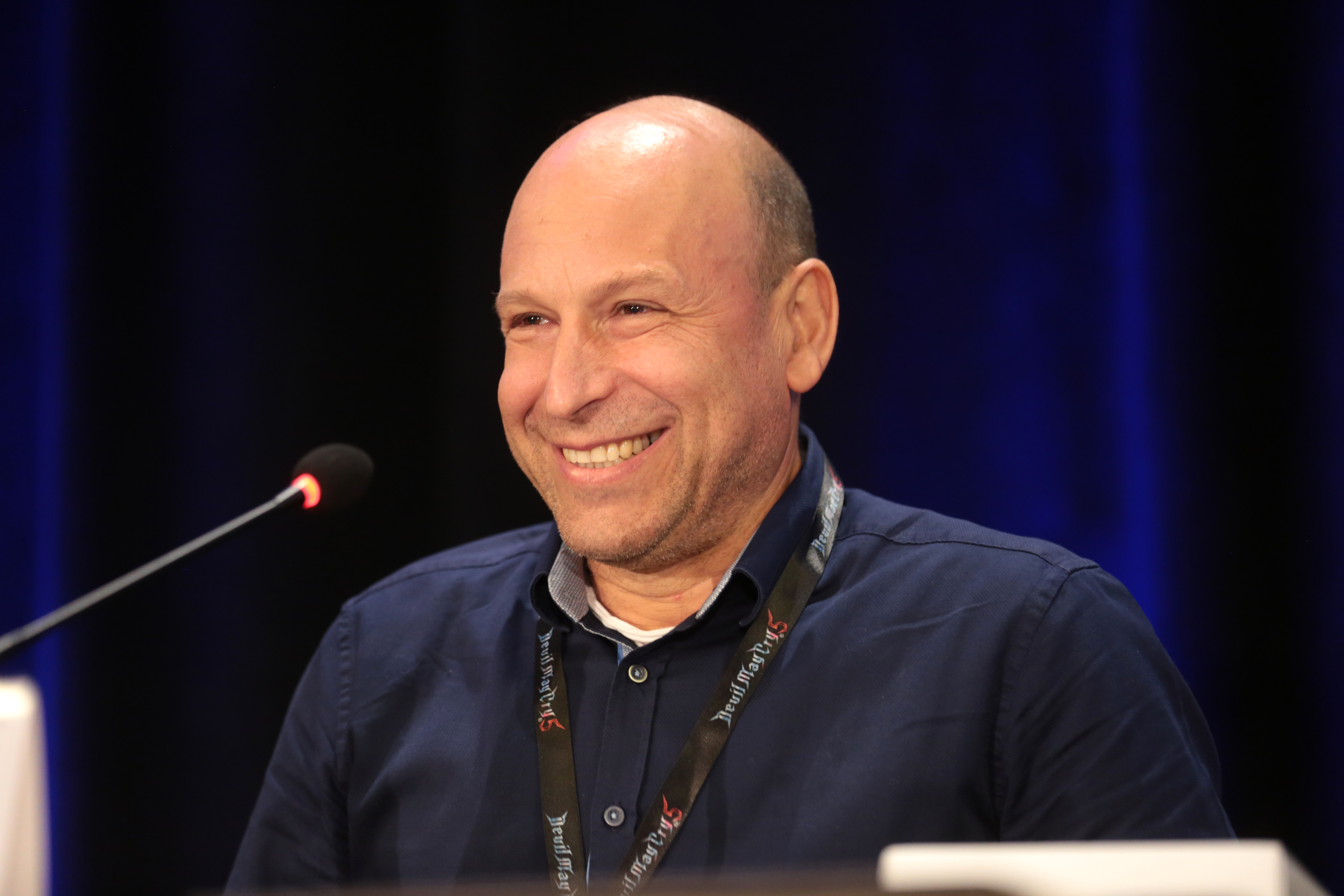
Inon Zur, Emmy Award, BAFTA-winning composer; notable for video game scores Dragon Age, The Elder Scrolls, Fallout, and Prince of Persia; and Star Trek, Power Rangers and Fallout TV series

- Jenni Alpert – singer-songwriter
- Sara Bareilles – Grammy Award-winning singer-songwriter and pianist
- Jan Berry – singer-songwriter; member of the rock-and-roll duo Jan & Dean
- Jeff Blue – music producer for various labels; vice president of Warner California's artists-and-repertoire division
- Alison Brown – Grammy Award-winning banjo player
- John Cage – composer; student of Schoenberg
- Marc Cohn – singer-songwriter
- Don Davis – film score composer, The Matrix trilogy (1999, 2003 and 2003)
- Brad Delson – guitarist; lead guitarist and founding member of the Grammy Award-winning rock band Linkin Park
- Ryan Dusick – drummer, member of the Grammy Award-winning pop-rock band Maroon 5
- Doriot Anthony Dwyer – principal flautist, Boston Symphony Orchestra
- John Fahey – experimental guitarist
- Five for Fighting, stage name of John Ondrasik – singer-songwriter
- Kyle Gass – musician, singer, songwriter; member of Grammy Award-winning duo Tenacious D with Jack Black
- Jill Gibson – singer-songwriter, photographer, painter and sculptor
- Greg Ginn – guitarist and singer-songwriter; guitarist of the punk-rock band Black Flag
- Kim Gordon – musician; member of the alternative-rock band Sonic Youth
- Greg Graffin – singer-songwriter; lead singer of the punk-rock band Bad Religion
- Conan Gray – singer-songwriter; former YouTuber
- Joshua Guerrero – operatic tenor
- Este Haim – member of Grammy-nominated sister band HAIM
- Jake Heggie – opera composer, Dead Man Walking
- Marilyn Horne – mezzo-soprano opera singer
- James Horner – Academy Award, Golden Globe Award, and Grammy Award-winning film-score composer; notable compositions include scores for Aliens, Glory, Titanic, Avatar
- Bruce Johnston – singer-songwriter, member of The Beach Boys
- Anthony Kiedis – singer-songwriter; lead vocalist of the alternative-rock band Red Hot Chili Peppers
- Jim Lindberg – singer-songwriter; lead singer of the punk-rock band Pennywise
- Jon MacLennan – session musician and music compositions for films such as Marley & Me: The Puppy Years
- Mickey Madden – bass guitarist of the Grammy Award-winning pop-rock band Maroon 5
- Ron Mael – musician and songwriter; co-founder (with brother Russell Mael) and keyboardist of the pop-rock band Sparks
- Russell Mael – singer-songwriter; co-founder (with brother Ron Mael) and lead vocalist of the pop-rock band Sparks
- Ray Manzarek – co-founder and keyboardist of the rock band The Doors
- Maile Misajon – singer-songwriter; former member of the pop girl group Eden's Crush
- Luke Mombrea – experimental classical music composer, Ivor Novello Award-winning composer
- Jim Morrison – poet and singer-songwriter; co-founder and lead vocalist of rock band The Doors
- Randy Newman – composer, pianist and singer-songwriter; Academy Award, Emmy Award and Grammy Award-winning film-score composer; notable compositions include scores for Toy Story, Cars, Monsters, Inc, and Meet the Parents franchise series
- NS Yoon-G, stage name of Christine Kim, aka Kim Yoonji – South Korean singer
- Mo Ostin – music executive, chairman emeritus of Warner Bros. Records
- Kira Roessler – musician and film and television dialogue editor; bass guitarist of the punk-rock band Black Flag
- Laura Roppé – singer-songwriter and writer; cancer survivor who wrote memoir Rocking the Pink: Finding Myself on the Other Side of Cancer
- Andy Sturmer – singer-songwriter and drummer of Jellyfish, producer for Puffy AmiYumi, composer of theme songs for Ben 10 and Teen Titans
- Paul Tanner – member of the Glenn Miller Orchestra, inventor of the Electro-Theremin instrument
- David Tao – singer
- Tiger JK, stage name of Seo Jung-kwon – Korean-American rapper; leader of hip hop group Drunken Tiger
- Brian Tyler – BAFTA-nominated film score composer, conductor and film producer; his compositions include scores for Fast & Furious franchise series, Iron Man 3, Thor: The Dark World, and Avengers: Age of Ultron
- Kamasi Washington – jazz saxophonist, composer, producer and bandleader
- John Williams – Academy Award, Emmy Award and Grammy Award-winning composer; notable compositions include scores for Harry Potter, Indiana Jones, Jurassic Park and Star Wars, film series
- La Monte Young – composer, leading figure in musical minimalism
- Inon Zur – BAFTA award and Emmy Award-winning video game and film score composer: notable compositions include scores for Digimon, Power Rangers, Dragon Age, EverQuest, Fallout, Prince of Persia, and Star Trek series

=== Film, television and theater ===
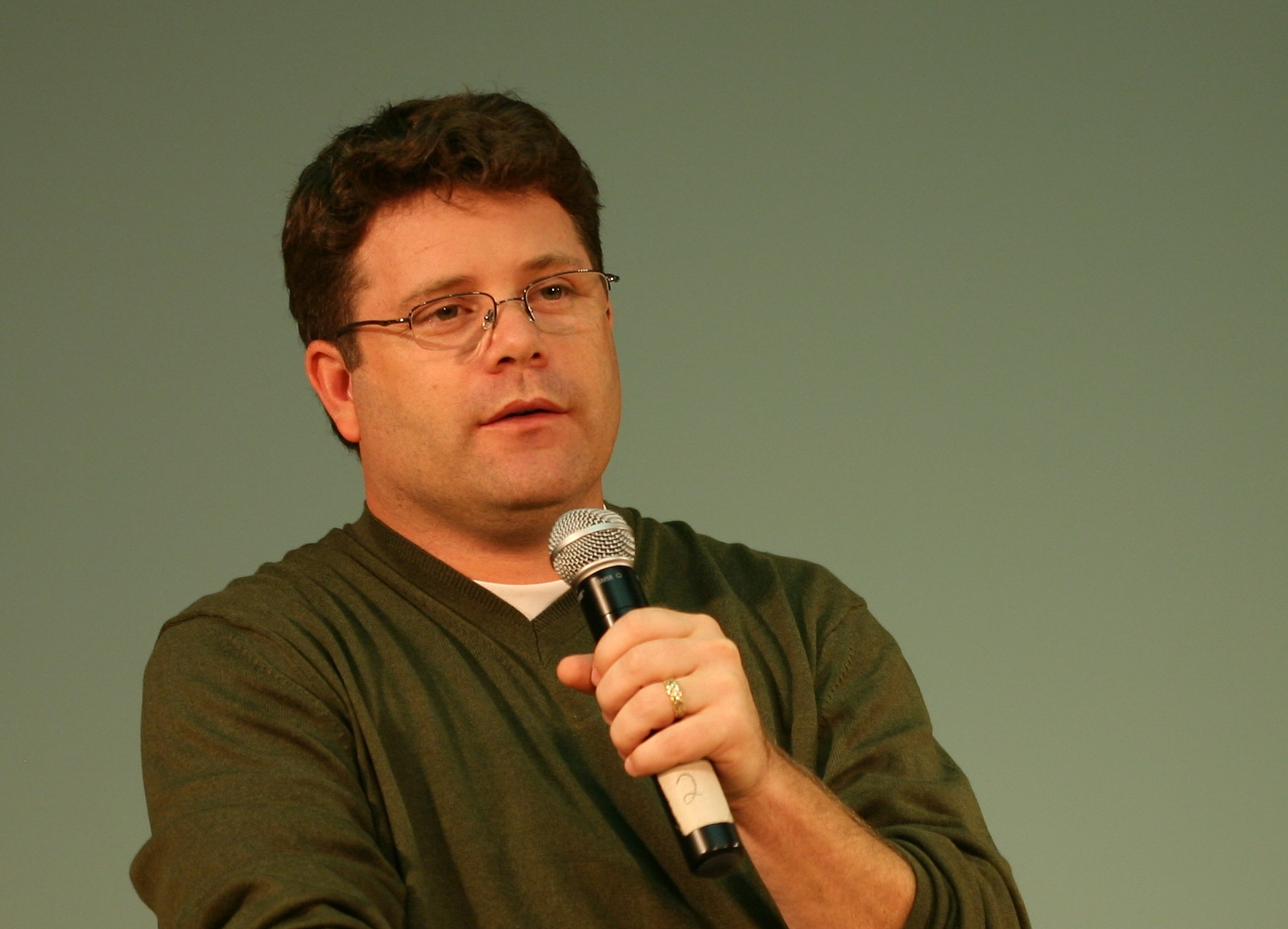
Sean Astin was a 2011 and 2024 commencement speaker at UCLA.

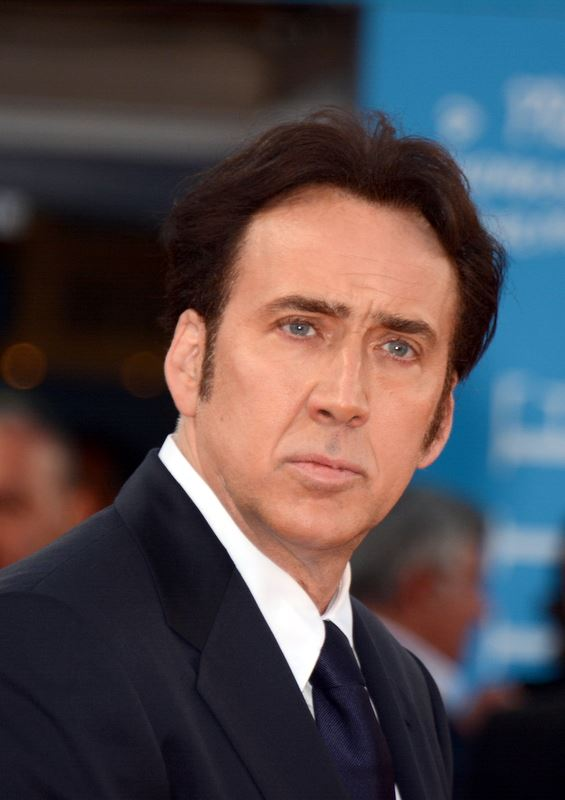
Nicolas Cage

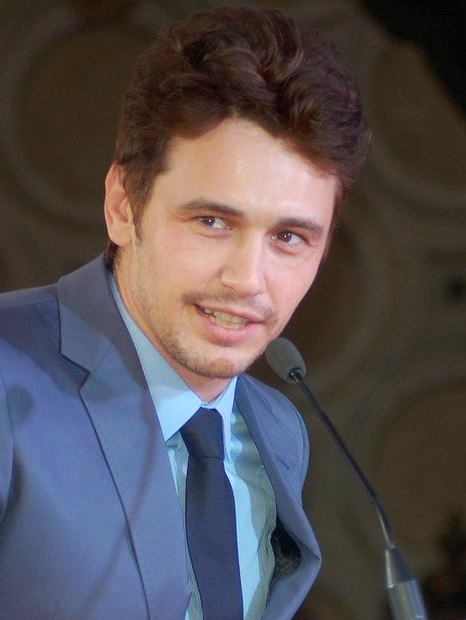
James Franco

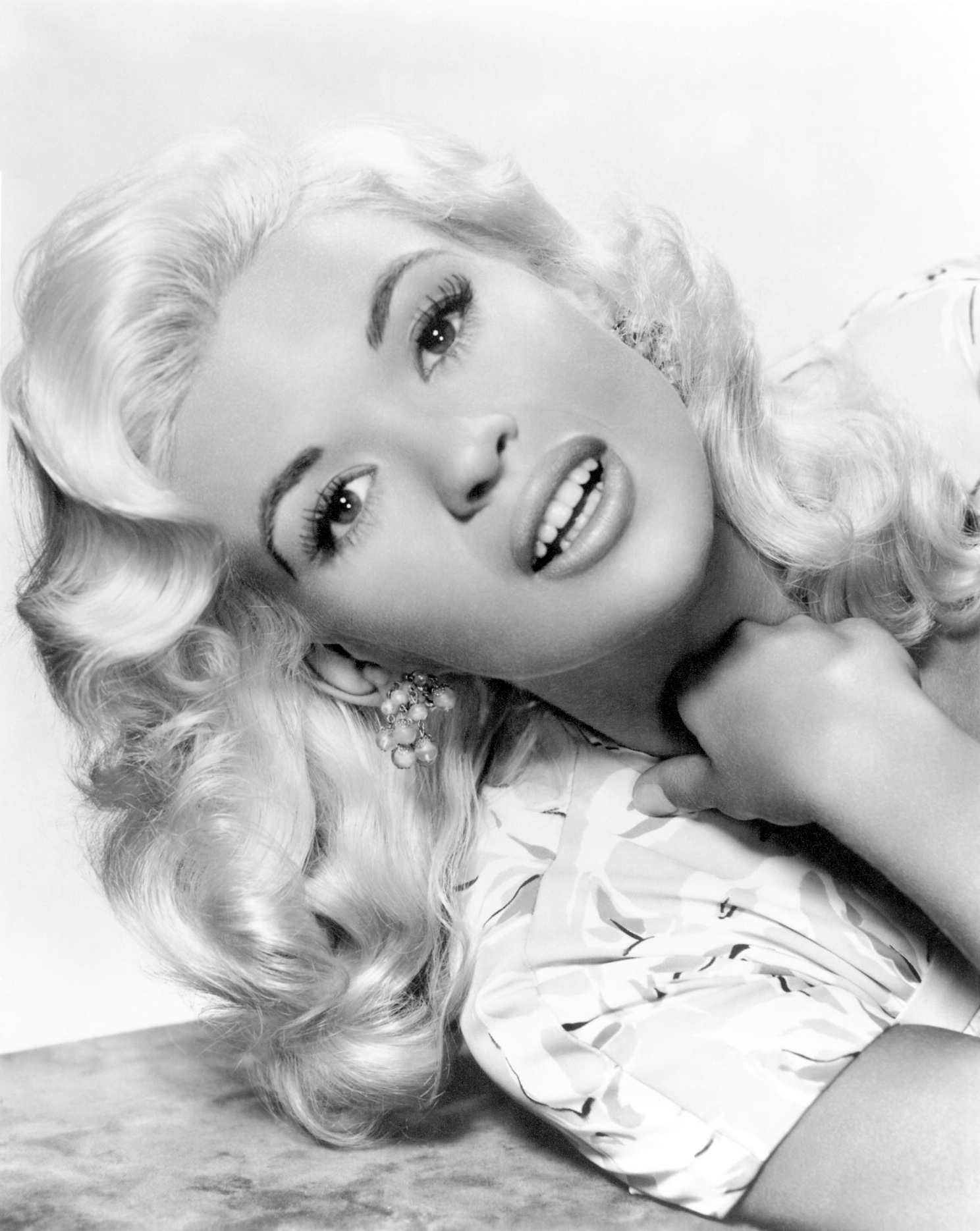
Jayne Mansfield

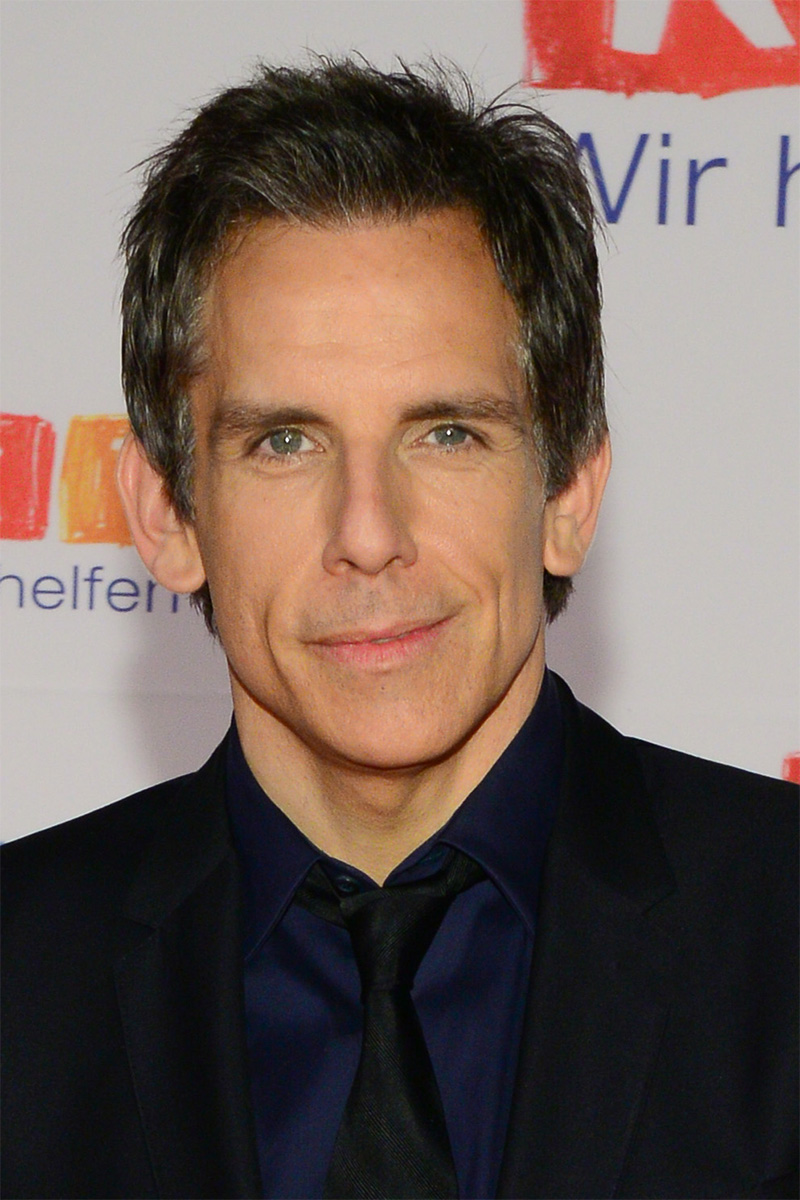
Ben Stiller

- Moustapha Akkad – film producer
- Corey Allen – actor, film director, writer, television director, and producer
- Rachel Ames – actress
- Inez Asher – television writer and novelist
- Sean Astin – actor
- Phil Austin – comedian and writer
- Sunkrish Bala – actor
- Carroll Ballard – film director
- Robert Balser – animator and animation director (Yellow Submarine)
- Carol Barbee – television producer
- William Bast – screenwriter and author
- Justine Bateman – actress, director, producer, Family Ties, Men Behaving Badly
- Beth Behrs – actress, 2 Broke Girls
- Catherine Bell – actress
- Mary Kay Bergman – voice actress
- Corbin Bernsen – actor
- Sarah Uriarte Berry – actress and singer
- Mayim Bialik – actress, sitcom television series Blossom and The Big Bang Theory; host of Jeopardy!
- Bruce Bilson – Primetime Emmy Award-winning director
- Dustin Lance Black – Academy Award-winning screenwriter for biographical film Milk
- Jack Black – actor, comedian and musician
- Shane Black – screenwriter; wrote buddy cop action film Lethal Weapon and crime black-comedy film Kiss, Kiss, Bang, Bang
- Paul Bloch – chairman of Rogers & Cowan, celebrity publicist
- Lo Bosworth – actress, Laguna Beach: The Real Orange County and The Hills
- Beau Bridges – actor
- Dorothy Bridges – actress and poet
- Lloyd Bridges – actor
- Carol Burnett – actress and comedian
- Charles Burnett – film director
- Michael Burns – actor and historian; child star of Wagon Train and It's a Man's World; professor emeritus in history, Mount Holyoke College; horse breeder in Danville, Kentucky
- Nakia Burrise - actress, Yellow Ranger in Power Rangers Zeo and the first Yellow Ranger in Power Rangers Turbo.
- Nicolas Cage – actor
- Patricia Cardoso – filmmaker, Real Women Have Curves
- Sofia Carson – actress
- Nancy Cartwright – Emmy Award-winning actress; voice of Bart Simpson
- Doug Chiang – Academy Award-winning film production designer
- Migdia Chinea – screenwriter; director; writer for films including The Incredible Hulk
- Tanya Chisholm – actress
- James Coburn – Academy Award-winning actor
- Ana Brenda Contreras – actress
- Josh Cooke – actor, Better With You
- Wyatt Emory Cooper – author, screenwriter, actor, father of Anderson Cooper
- Eleanor Coppola – Emmy Award-winning documentary filmmaker
- Francis Ford Coppola – Academy Award-winning film director, screenwriter; co-wrote and directed the Godfather Trilogy and Apocalypse Now
- Alex Cox – film director and screenwriter; wrote and directed Repo Man and Sid and Nancy
- Jeanne Crain – actress, Pinky, State Fair, Leave Her to Heaven, A Letter to Three Wives and Gentlemen Marry Brunettes
- Mark Cullen – Emmy-nominated television writer, screenwriter; Cop Out
- Robb Cullen – Emmy-nominated television writer, screenwriter; Cop Out
- Julie Dash – film director; wrote and directed Daughters of the Dust
- Jonathan Dayton – film director; co-directed Little Miss Sunshine
- James Dean – Academy Award-nominated actor (dropped out after one semester)
- Debi Derryberry - voice actress, Jimmy Neutron franchise
- Joyce DeWitt – actress, Three's Company
- Shirley Dinsdale – winner of the first "Emmys" for Judy Splinters in 1949
- Deepti Divakar – Indian model, actress, writer and Miss India World 1981
- David Dorfman – actor, child prodigy, and attorney
- John Duda – actor
- Merrin Dungey – actress, King of Queens, Big Little Lies
- Robert Englund – actor, Freddy Krueger in the A Nightmare on Elm Street franchise
- Josh Evans – actor, director and producer
- Blake McIver Ewing – actor and musician
- Will Forte – actor and comedian
- James Franco – Academy Award-nominated actor, also taught film classes
- Eddie Frierson – actor
- Brad Garrett – actor and comedian
- Barbara Garshman – television producer, writer and executive
- Kathy Garver – actress, Family Affair
- Caitlin Gerard – actress, American Crime
- Alex Gibney – documentary filmmaker
- Lillian Glass – author, TV commentator, body language expert
- Dan Gordon – screenwriter
- Christopher Gorham – actor
- Horace Hahn – actor
- Marilyn Hall – Canadian-born American producer
- Kristin Hanggi – Tony Award-nominated theater director
- Chris Hardwick – actor, comedian and television personality; host of popular-science documentary television series Wired Science
- Catherine Hardwicke – film director and screenwriter
- Mariska Hargitay – Emmy Award-winning actress, Law & Order: Special Victims Unit
- Mark Harmon – actor; played quarterback on the school's football team (1971–1973)
- Kayo Hatta – film director, Picture Bride
- Micol Hebron – multidisciplinary contemporary artist
- Felicia D. Henderson – television producer, writer, and director, and co-creator of Soul Food
- Michael Hitchcock – actor, Waiting for Guffman, Best in Show, Serenity
- Laurie Holden – actress, producer and human rights activist
- Earl Holliman – Golden Globe-winning film and TV actor
- Benjamin Howard – filmmaker
- Allan Hunt – film, television and stage actor
- John Ireland – sportscaster
- Brittany Ishibashi – actress
- Jon Jashni – producer; co-founder and former president, Legendary Entertainment; studio executive, 20th Century Fox, Columbia Pictures
- Mike Jittlov – independent animator
- Anne-Marie Johnson – actress
- Judy Kaye – Tony Award-winning actress and singer
- Staci Keanan – actress, Step by Step and My Two Dads; currently deputy district attorney with Los Angeles County District Attorney's Office
- Joanna Kerns – actress
- Taran Killam – actor, comedian
- Derek Klena – Tony Award-nominated actor and singer, Anastasia, Jagged Little Pill
- Walter Koenig – actor, Star Trek
- David Koepp – screenwriter
- Mila Kunis – actress
- Carlos Lacámara – actor
- Lloyd LaCuesta – KTVU television news reporter, bureau chief, San Francisco Bay Area
- Christine Lakin – actress, Step by Step
- Suzanne Lanza – model
- Judy Alice Lee – voice actress
- Karenssa LeGear – actress
- Robert Lehrer – actor
- Victoria Ann Lewis – actress and theatre creator
- Justin Lin – film director; co-wrote and directed Better Luck Tomorrow
- Heather Locklear – actress
- Allan Loeb – screenwriter and film producer
- Josie Loren – actress, Make It or Break It
- Masiela Lusha – actress and writer
- Meredith MacRae – actress
- Jayne Mansfield – actress and model
- Bridget Marquardt – co-star of The Girls Next Door
- Frank Marshall – film producer
- Jeanine Mason – winner of So You Think You Can Dance, season 5
- Doug McClure – actor
- Elizabeth McGovern – actress
- Danica McKellar – actress, The Wonder Years
- Scott Mechlowicz – actor
- Mike Medavoy – film producer
- Darius Mehrjui – film director
- Nigel Miguel – actor, film producer, Belize film commissioner
- Victor Millan – actor and professor
- Emud Mokhberi – Academy Award-nominated film director; photographer
- Niels Mueller – film director and screenwriter
- Mary Nguyen – Emmy-nominated investigative journalist; Teen Magazine's Miss Teenage America 1993
- Leonard Nimoy – actor, director and photographer
- Larry Niven – science fiction writer, Ringworld
- Matt Nix – writer and producer, Burn Notice
- Lisa Onodera – film producer, Picture Bride, The Debut, Day of Independence and Americanese
- John Orloff – screenwriter
- Danielle Panabaker – actress
- Kay Panabaker – actress
- Bryce Papenbrook – voice actor
- Randall Park – actor, comedian
- Alexander Payne – Academy Award-winning filmmaker; film director and co-screenwriter of Election, About Schmidt and Sideways
- Nasim Pedrad – actress; cast member on Saturday Night Live
- Kal Penn – actor
- Kelly Perdew – winner of The Apprentice
- Frank Peretti – author, film producer and screenwriter
- Gina Prince-Bythewood – film director and screenwriter; wrote and directed Love & Basketball
- Emily Ratajkowski – model
- Autumn Reeser – actress
- Tasha Reign – pornographic actress
- Rob Reiner – actor and film director; directed The Princess Bride and When Harry Met Sally...
- Nicole Riegel – screenwriter, director
- Tim Robbins – Academy Award-winning actor, film director and social activist; wrote and directed Bob Roberts and Dead Man Walking
- Nicolette Robinson – actor; starred in stage productions of Brooklynite and Waitress
- Fred Roos – producer of many Francis Ford Coppola films, including The Godfather Part II
- Dev Ross – Annie Award, Emmy Award, Humanitas Award, and PBS ACT Award-winning screenwriter; Winnie the Pooh and The Return of Jafar
- Eric Roth – Academy Award-winning screenwriter
- Nick Sagan – science-fiction novelist and screenwriter
- Paul Schrader – screenwriter and film director; wrote Taxi Driver and Raging Bull
- Arnold Shapiro – Academy Award and Emmy Award-winning director and producer
- Harry Shearer – actor and comedian, The Simpsons
- Dax Shepard – actor
- Armin Shimerman – actor
- Brad Silberling – film director and screenwriter
- David Silverman – animator, director, producer of The Simpsons; director of The Simpsons Movie, and co-director of Monsters, Inc.
- Jeremy Sisto – actor
- Tom Skerritt – Emmy Award-winning actor
- John Smith – actor
- Darren Star – producer; creator of Beverly Hills, 90210 and Sex and the City
- David J. Steiner – documentary filmmaker, educator, rabbi and political activist
- Ben Stiller – actor and comedian
- Joel Surnow – co-creator of 24
- Sydney Sweeney – actress
- Cynthia Szigeti – actress and improv teacher
- Wes Takahashi – visual effects supervisor and animator
- George Takei – actor, Star Trek; announcer for The Howard Stern Show
- Chris Tashima – Academy Award-winning film director and actor
- Peter Tomarken – game show host; Press Your Luck
- Tamlyn Tomita – actress
- Tritia Toyota – news anchor, CBS 2 Los Angeles
- Ham Tran – film director, Journey from the Fall
- Kelly Marie Tran – actress
- Gabrielle Union – actress
- David Valdes – Academy Award-nominated producer
- Milo Ventimiglia – actor, Heroes, Gilmore Girls, This Is Us
- Gore Verbinski – film director; directed the Pirates of the Caribbean film series
- Michael Warren – actor, Hill Street Blues; played on UCLA's basketball national championship teams in 1967 and 1968
- Jaleel White – actor, Family Matters
- John J. B. Wilson – writer, creator of the Golden Raspberry Awards
- Amy Winfrey – artist and animator
- Eric Winter – actor
- Ali Wong – writer and comedian
- Stephen Worth – producer and director of the ASIFA-Hollywood Animation Archive Project
- Leonard Wu – actor
- Jenny Yang – writer and comedian
- Hoyt Yeatman – Academy Award-winning visual-effects supervisor
- Caveh Zahedi – filmmaker
- Daphne Zuniga – actress, Melrose Place, One Tree Hill

=== Journalism, media and news ===
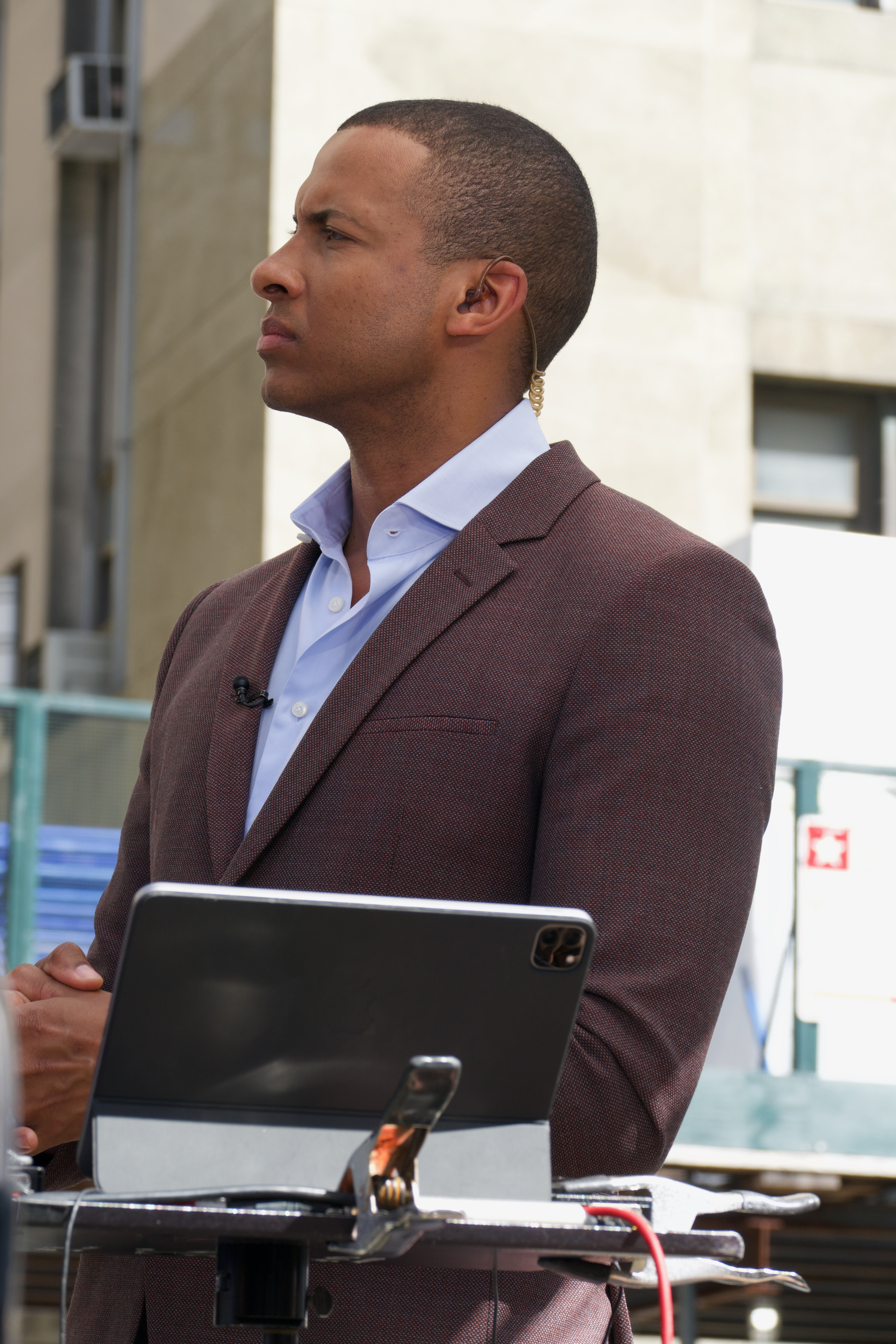
Errol Barnett, CBS News anchor

- Gustavo Arellano – OC Weekly writer and author of the "¡Ask a Mexican!" column
- Jules Asner – entertainment journalist, television personality, and model
- Rudi Bakhtiar – national news anchor
- Errol Barnett – CBS News anchor
- Tony Blankley – commentator on The McLaughlin Group
- Cari Champion – broadcast journalist and TV personality
- Paul Colichman – founder of Here! cable TV network
- Iva Toguri D'Aquino – World War II radio propagandist, "Tokyo Rose"
- Hal Fishman – longest-running news anchor in American television; KTLA 5 News Los Angeles
- Josh E. Gross – publisher of Beverly Hills Weekly
- Todd Harris – sports announcer and reporter for NBC Sports
- Ezra Klein – blogger; journalist, Vox.com
- Flora Lewis – journalist with The New York Times
- Carol Lin – national news anchor; known for being the first news anchor to report on the 9/11 attacks, reporting for CNN
- Laura Ling – journalist with Current TV, notable for her detainment in North Korea
- Steve Sailer – blogger and journalist (VDARE)
- Josh Scherer – chef and internet personality, host of Mythical Kitchen; YouTuber
- Ben Shapiro – conservative commentator, editor/founder of The Daily Wire
- Joel Siegel – film critic and television journalist
- Shirlee Smith – talk show host, columnist
- Marcus Stern – Pulitzer Prize-winning journalist

=== Law, government, and public policy ===
- Shahid Khaqan Abbasi – prime minister of Pakistan
- Farid Abboud – ambassador of Lebanon to United States
- Leslie Abramson – attorney, best known for the defense of Erik Menendez
- Senu Abdul Rahman – former member of the Malaysian Parliament, Malaysia's first Minister of Information
- Eugene Anderson – attorney
- Glenn M. Anderson – United States representative from California (1969–1993)
- Patrick Argüello – Nicaraguan-American revolutionary
- Howard Berman – member of the U.S. House of Representatives
- Joseph Blatchford – third director of the United States Peace Corps
- Tom Bradley – mayor of Los Angeles (1973–1993)
- Joe Brown – television judge
- Janice Rogers Brown – judge for the D.C. Circuit Court of Appeals
- Vincent Bugliosi – attorney and writer
- Yvonne Braithwaite Burke – Los Angeles County supervisor
- John Campbell – member of the U.S. House of Representatives
- Roel Campos – former commissioner of the U.S. Securities and Exchange Commission (2002–2007)
- Cormac J. Carney – United States federal judge
- William George Carr – executive secretary of the National Education Association, 1952–1967
- Phil Carter – attorney, writer, and U.S. Army adviser in Iraq
- Benjamin Cayetano – governor of Hawaii (1994–2002)
- Judy Chu – first Chinese-American woman ever elected to the U.S. Congress
- Morgan Chu – attorney, intellectual property expert
- Frank Chuman – attorney and author
- Marcia Clark – attorney, lead prosecutor in O. J. Simpson murder case
- Margaret Hayes Clark – mayor of Rosemead, California, Rosemead City Council member, and great-granddaughter of U.S. President Rutherford B. Hayes
- Johnnie Cochran – attorney
- Jeff Cohen – entertainment lawyer best known for work as child actor in The Goonies (1985)
- Lynn Compton – former judge for the California Court of Appeals; served as a commissioned officer with E Company, 2nd Battalion, 506th Parachute Infantry Regiment, in the 101st Airborne Division of the United States Army
- James C. Corman – Los Angeles City Council member; member of the U.S. House of Representatives
- J. Curtis Counts – director, Federal Mediation and Conciliation Service
- Clifford B. Drake – Marine Corps major general
- Edmund D. Edelman – Los Angeles City Council member (1965–1974); Los Angeles County Board of Supervisors member (1975–1994)
- John Ehrlichman – assistant and counsel to the Richard M. Nixon presidential administration
- Robert C. Farrell – journalist; Los Angeles City Council member (1974–1991)
- Keith Fink – attorney
- Dean Florez – member of the California State Senate, student body president at UCLA
- Vince Fong – member of the U.S. House of Representatives
- Dolly Gee – U.S. District Court judge
- Kirsten Gillibrand – U.S. senator from New York
- Bruce Givner – played a minor role on the evening of the Watergate burglary
- Horace Hahn – assisted Justice Robert H. Jackson as an interrogator in the prosecution of Nazi war criminals at the Nuremberg Trials
- H.R. Haldeman – chief of staff for the Richard M. Nixon presidential administration; a key figure in the Watergate scandal
- James Day Hodgson – former United States Secretary of Labor and Ambassador to Japan
- Shawn Holley – member of O. J. Simpson murder case defense team
- Andrei Iancu – director of the United States Patent and Trademark Office
- Lance Ito – retired judge, best known for presiding over the criminal trial for the O. J. Simpson murder case
- Frank B. James – U.S. Air Force general
- Mack E. Jenkins – former federal prosecutor
- Ysabel Jurado – Los Angeles City Council member
- Paul Koretz – former member of the California State Assembly; Los Angeles City Council member
- Alex Kozinski – judge for the Ninth Circuit Court of Appeals
- Sheila Kuehl – former member of the California State Senate, California State Assembly, and current Los Angeles County Board of Supervisors
- Jerry Lewis – member of the U.S. House of Representatives, chairman of the U.S. House Committee on Appropriations
- Calum MacDonald – former member of Parliament in the United Kingdom
- Roberto Madrazo – candidate for president of Mexico in the 2006 presidential elections
- Jim Matheson – member of the U.S. House of Representatives for Utah
- Tom McClintock – member of the U.S. House of Representatives
- Tim McOsker – Los Angeles City Council member
- David McReynolds – activist and socialist political candidate
- Billy G. Mills – Los Angeles City Council member, 1963–74, Superior Court judge thereafter
- Marvin Mitchelson – attorney
- Lloyd Monserratt – California political and community leader
- Bill Morrow – member of the California State Senate
- Dorothy W. Nelson – senior judge for the Ninth Circuit Court of Appeals
- Michael Newdow – plaintiff in Supreme Court case that challenged the constitutionality of the Pledge of Allegiance
- Robert C. O'Brien – United States National Security Advisor
- Steve Parode – U. S. Navy rear admiral
- William R. Peers – U.S. Army lt. general best known for leading the army's investigation of the My Lai incident
- Daniel Petrocelli – attorney
- Harry Pregerson – judge for the Ninth Circuit Court of Appeals
- Jennifer Rodgers – former United States Attorney for the Southern District of New York and CNN legal analyst
- Giora Romm – former deputy commander of the Israeli Air Force (IAF), director of the Civil Aviation Authority of Israel and of the Ministry of National Infrastructure
- Dennis Ross – U.S. diplomat to the Middle East
- Edward R. Roybal – member of the U.S. House of Representatives
- James M. Seely – U.S. Navy rear admiral and acting Assistant Secretary of the Navy (Financial Management and Comptroller) 1988–1990
- Robert Shapiro – attorney, part of defense team in O. J. Simpson murder case
- Brad Sherman – member of the U.S. House of Representatives
- Thomas Shultz – U.S. Navy rear admiral
- Helen Singleton – civil rights activist and Freedom Rider
- Cheng Siwei – former vice chairman of the Standing Committee of the National People's Congress of the People's Republic of China
- William French Smith – former United States attorney general
- Todd Spitzer – member of the California State Assembly
- William R. Steiger – director, U.S. Department of Health and Human Services's Office of Global Health Affairs in the George W. Bush administration
- Ted Stevens – former senator of Alaska and alumnus of Delta Kappa Epsilon
- Peggy Stevenson – Los Angeles City Council member (1975–1985)
- Edward Tabash – constitutional attorney specializing in church and state issues; board of directors for the Center for Inquiry
- Robert Mitsuhiro Takasugi – federal judge
- A. Wallace Tashima – judge for the Ninth Circuit Court of Appeals
- Alan S. Thompson – retired U.S. Navy vice admiral
- Rick Tuttle – Freedom Rider and Los Angeles City Controller
- Antonio Villaraigosa – mayor of Los Angeles; former Speaker of the California Assembly
- Joel Wachs – Los Angeles City Council member (1970–2001); president of the Andy Warhol Foundation for the Visual Arts in New York City
- Francis B. Wai – Medal of Honor recipient
- Mimi Walters – member of the U.S. House of Representatives
- Kim McLane Wardlaw – judge for the Ninth Circuit Court of Appeals
- Diane Watson – member of the U.S. House of Representatives
- Henry Waxman – member of the U.S. House of Representatives
- Shirley Weber – Secretary of State of California
- Lezlee Westine – former director of the Office of Public Liaison (2001–2005)
- Harold Willens – Jewish American businessman, political donor, nuclear freeze activist
- Helena Wong – member of the Legislative Council of Hong Kong, lecturer at Hong Kong Polytechnic University
- Katsuo Yakura – member of the House of Councillors for Saitama Prefecture
- Mia Yamamoto – attorney and civil rights activist
- Zev Yaroslavsky – Los Angeles City Council member; Los Angeles County Board of Supervisors member
- Ehsan Zaffar – author; faculty; senior advisor on civil rights, U.S. Dept. of Homeland Security
- Ken Ziffren – entertainment attorney, L.A.'s film czar (2014–present)

=== Sports ===
==== Hall of Famers in major team sports ====
===== National Baseball Hall of Fame =====
- Jackie Robinson (inducted in 1962)

===== Pro Football Hall of Fame =====
- Bob Waterfield (inducted in 1965)
- Tom Fears (inducted in 1970)
- Jimmy Johnson (inducted in 1994)
- Troy Aikman (inducted in 2006)
- Jonathan Ogden (inducted in 2013)
- Kenny Easley (inducted in 2017)

===== Naismith Memorial Basketball Hall of Fame =====
- John Wooden (inducted in 1973)
- Bill Walton (inducted in 1993)
- Ann Meyers (inducted in 1993)
- Denny Crum (inducted in 1994)
- Kareem Abdul-Jabbar (inducted in 1995)
- Gail Goodrich (inducted in 1996)
- Denise Curry (inducted in 1997)
- Larry Brown (inducted in 2002)
- Reggie Miller (inducted in 2012)
- Jamaal Wilkes (inducted in 2012)
- Donald Barksdale (inducted in 2012)

==== Baseball ====
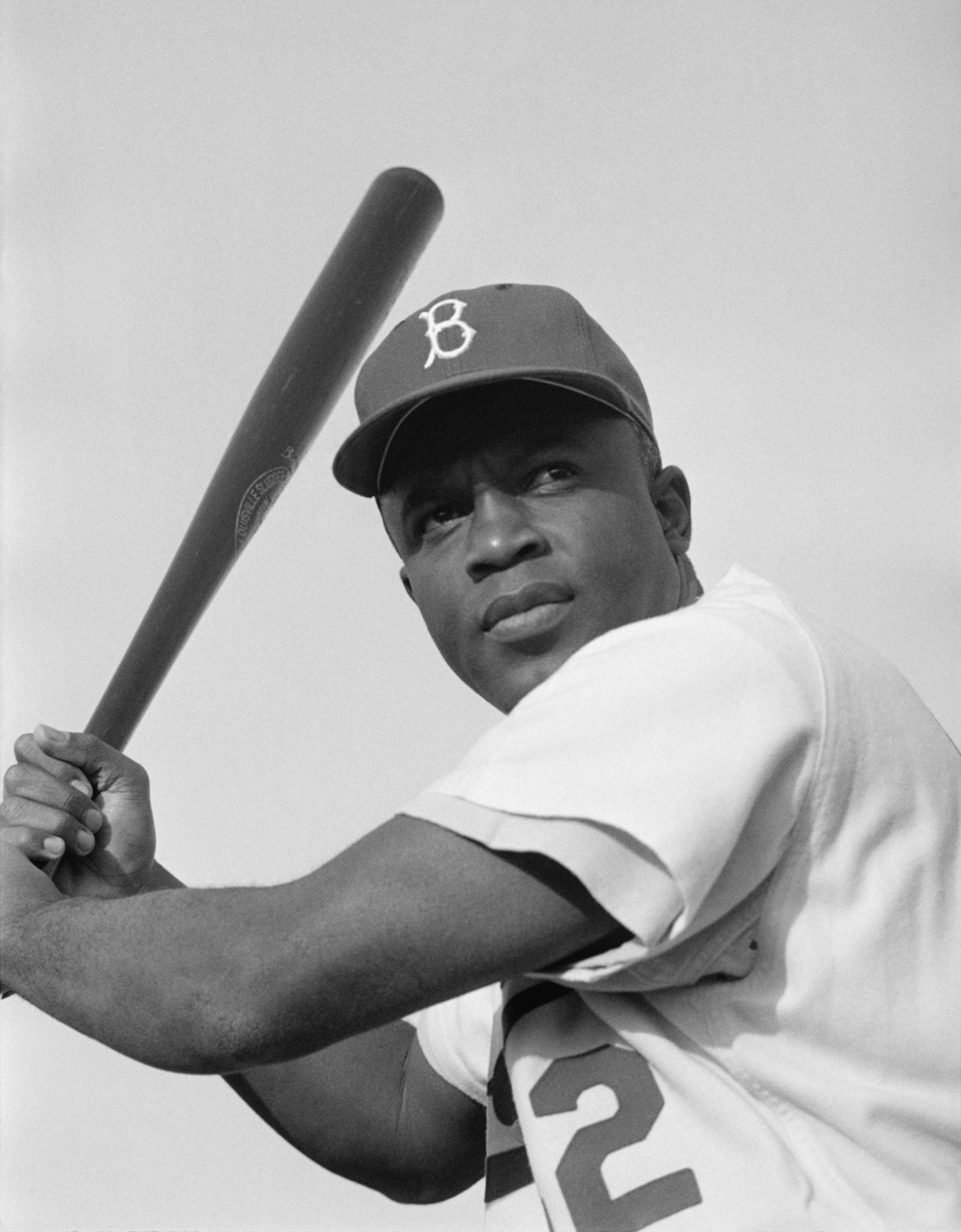
Jackie Robinson

- Héctor Ambriz – Major League Baseball pitcher for the Houston Astros
- Garrett Atkins – Major League Baseball first baseman; Colorado Rockies (2003–2009), Baltimore Orioles (2010)
- Trevor Bauer – Major League Baseball pitcher for the Los Angeles Dodgers
- Jake Bird – Major League Baseball pitcher for the Colorado Rockies
- Eric Byrnes – former Major League Baseball outfielder
- Gerrit Cole – Major League Baseball pitcher for the New York Yankees
- Dick Conger – Major League Baseball pitcher
- Jeff Conine – former Major League Baseball first baseman and outfielder; two-time World Series champion
- Brandon Crawford – Major League Baseball shortstop for the San Francisco Giants
- Cody Decker – Major League Baseball infielder and outfielder for the San Diego Padres
- Troy Glaus – former Major League Baseball first baseman and third baseman; recipient, Most Valuable Player Award for the 2002 World Series
- Casey Janssen – Toronto Blue Jays relief pitcher
- Eric Karros – former Major League Baseball first baseman; 1992 National League Rookie of the Year; sports commentator and reporter, including ESPN and KCAL-TV (Los Angeles)
- Tim Leary – former Major League Baseball pitcher
- Thad Levine – general manager of the Minnesota Twins
- Torey Lovullo – former Major League Baseball infielder and minor league manager; manager of the Arizona Diamondbacks
- Adam Melhuse – former Major League Baseball catcher
- Jim Parque – former Major League Baseball pitcher
- Chris Pritchett – international scout; former Major League Baseball first baseman
- Dave Roberts – manager of the Los Angeles Dodgers – former Major League Baseball outfielder; 2004 World Series champion with Boston Red Sox; San Francisco Giants (2007–2008)
- Jackie Robinson – Major League Baseball second baseman; first African-American MLB player (with the Brooklyn Dodgers in 1947); 1962 National Baseball Hall of Fame inductee; first UCLA student to letter in four sports: baseball, basketball, football, and track (did not graduate)
- Chase Strumpf – baseball second baseman and third baseman in the Chicago Cubs organization
- Chase Utley – Major League Baseball second baseman; 2008 World Series champion with the Philadelphia Phillies
- Zack Weiss - American-Israeli Major League Baseball pitcher
- Matt Young – former Major League Baseball pitcher
- Todd Zeile – former Major League Baseball catcher, third baseman and first baseman

==== Basketball ====
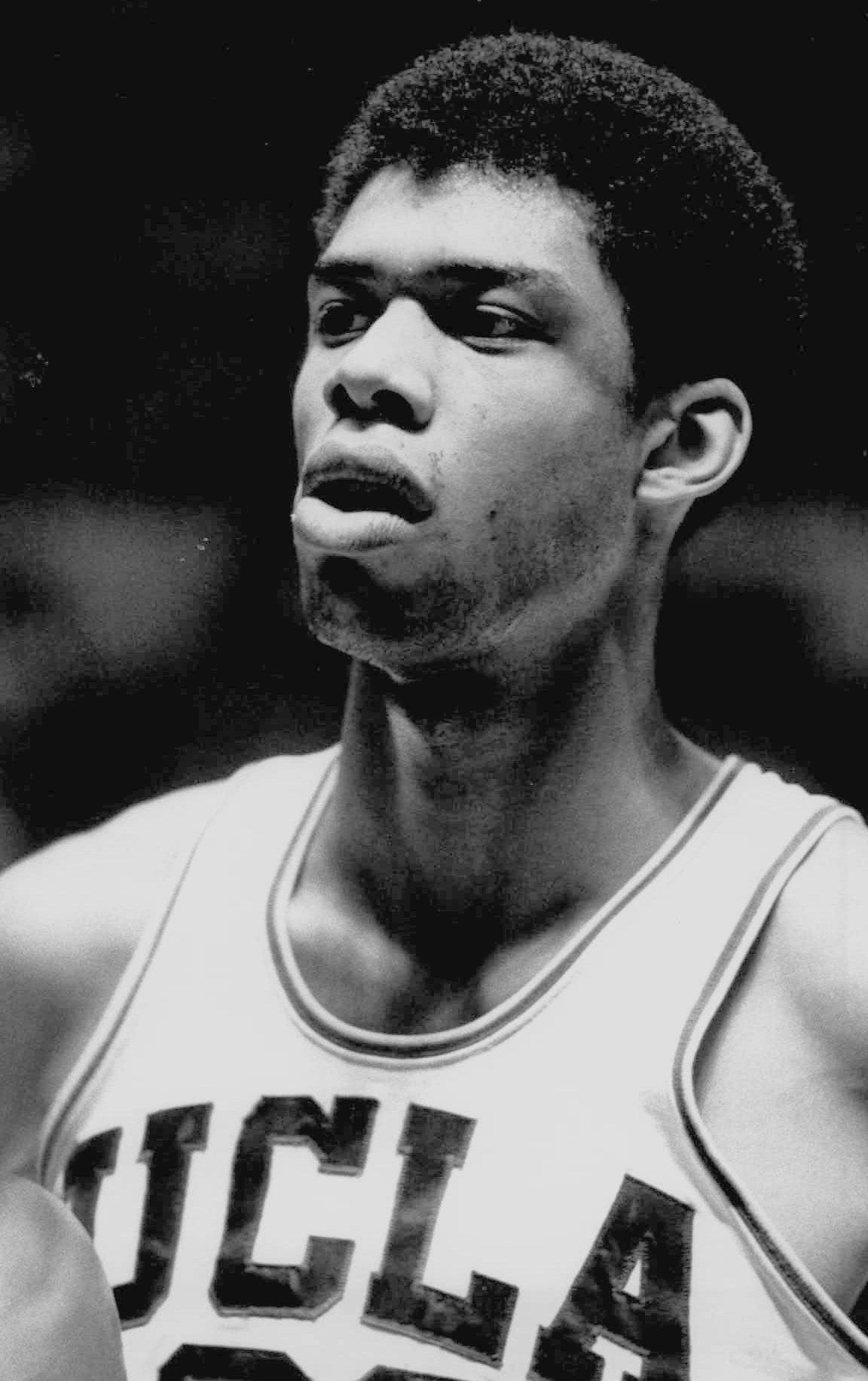
Kareem Abdul-Jabbar (Lew Alcindor), six-time NBA MVP, Hall of Famer

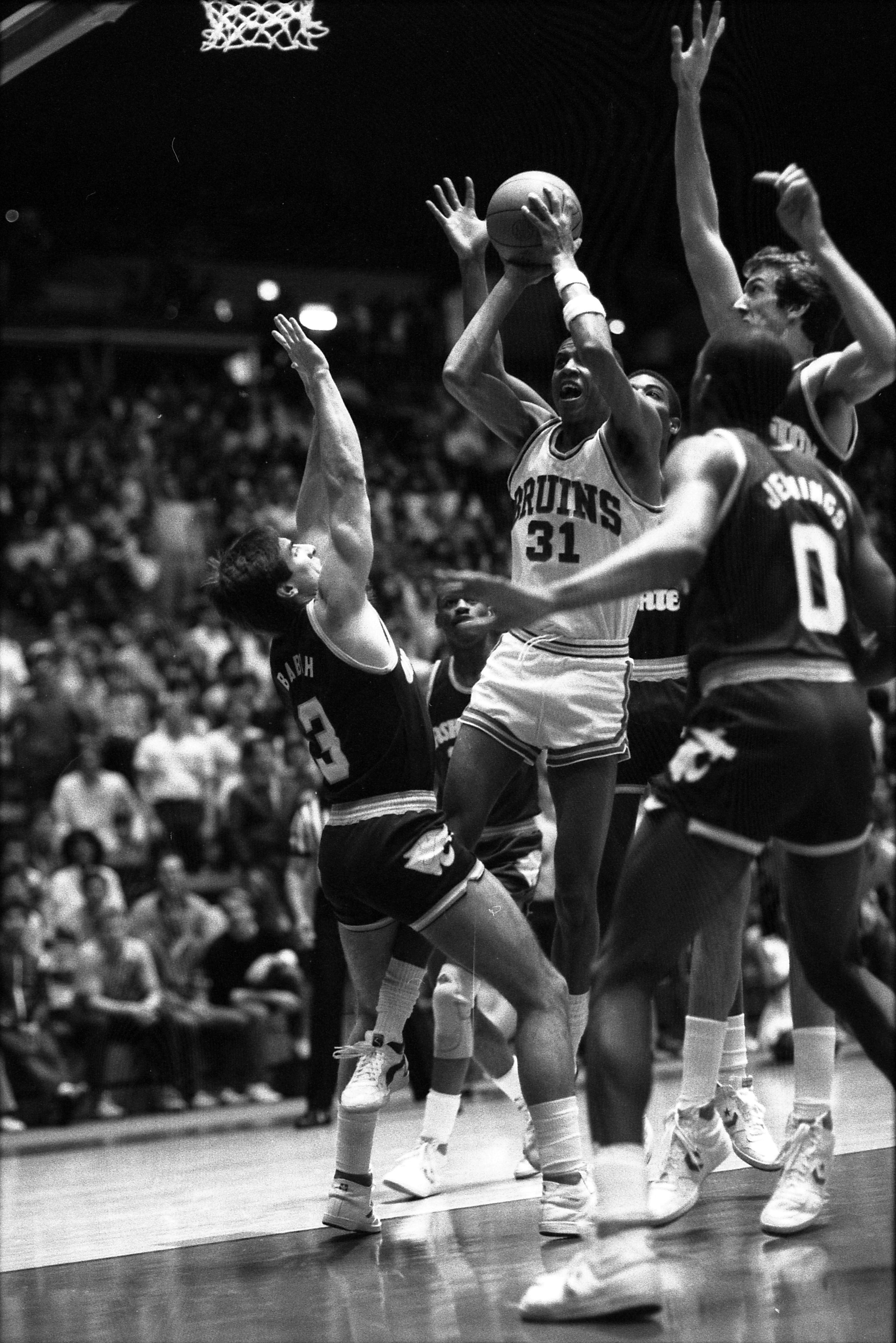
Reggie Miller, Hall of Famer

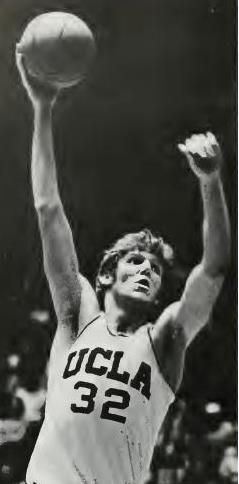
Bill Walton, NBA MVP, Hall of Famer

- Kareem Abdul-Jabbar (played as Lew Alcindor at UCLA) – six-time National Basketball Association champion; NBA's second all-time leading scorer; member of the Basketball Hall of Fame
- Val Ackerman – commissioner of the Big East Conference, first president of the WNBA, former pro basketball player
- Arron Afflalo – former National Basketball Association player
- Bryce Alford – professional basketball player
- Kyle Anderson – National Basketball Association player
- Ike Anigbogu – National Basketball Association player, Indiana Pacers
- Trevor Ariza – former National Basketball Association player
- Amari Bailey – Israeli Basketball Premier League and formerly National Basketball Association player
- LiAngelo Ball – professional basketball player, briefly attended
- Lonzo Ball – National Basketball Association player, 2nd overall pick in 2017 NBA draft
- Sam Balter – Olympic gold medalist
- Donald Barksdale – first African-American basketball All-American, Olympic gold medalist, NBA All-Star, member of the Basketball Hall of Fame
- Matt Barnes – former National Basketball Association player
- Nikki Blue – former Women's National Basketball Association player and coach
- Jonah Bolden – professional basketball player
- Darren Collison – former National Basketball Association player
- Denise Curry – former professional and Olympic player and former women's basketball program head coach at CSU, Fullerton
- Baron Davis – former National Basketball Association player
- Mark Eaton – professional basketball player; his No. 53 retired by Utah Jazz
- Tyus Edney – former National Basketball Association player and coach
- Jordan Farmar – former National Basketball Association player
- Dan Gadzuric – former National Basketball Association player
- Corey Gaines – former basketball player and coach
- Gail Goodrich – National Basketball Association Hall of Fame player; won an NBA championship with the Los Angeles Lakers
- Stuart Gray – former National Basketball Association player
- Issac Hamilton – professional basketball player
- Andy Hill – 3x college national champion basketball player, president of CBS Productions and Channel One News, author, and motivational speaker
- Jack Hirsch – basketball player and coach
- Jrue Holiday – National Basketball Association player, two-time NBA champion, two-time NBA All Star
- Nicole Kaczmarski – former WNBA player (did not graduate)
- Jason Kapono – former National Basketball Association player
- Mitch Kupchak – general manager for the Charlotte Hornets
- Zach LaVine – National Basketball Association player, two-time NBA All Star
- T. J. Leaf – professional basketball player
- Cliff Livingston – former National Basketball Association player and coach
- Kevin Love – National Basketball Association player; 5th overall pick in 2008 NBA draft, NBA champion, four-time NBA All Star, and Olympic gold medalist
- Maylana Martin – Women's National Basketball Association player; assistant coach at UCLA
- Luc Mbah a Moute – former NBA player
- Andre McCarter – former NBA player
- Ann Meyers – Hall of Fame basketball player and Olympic silver medalist
- Reggie Miller – former National Basketball Association player, Olympic gold medalist, and third All-Time in 3-pointers, member of the Basketball Hall of Fame
- Dave Minor – former National Basketball Association player
- Jerome Moiso – American professional basketball player in Europe, former NBA player
- Shabazz Muhammad – National Basketball Association player
- Willie Naulls – former National Basketball Association player
- Teiko Nishi – high school basketball coach
- Ed O'Bannon – basketball player, led Bruins to the 1995 NCAA Men's Division I Basketball Championship
- Anita Ortega – Women's Professional Basketball League player
- Norman Powell – National Basketball Association player
- Noelle Quinn – Women's National Basketball Association player
- Pooh Richardson – former National Basketball Association player
- Brandon Schneider – NBA executive and president of the Golden State Warriors
- Dijon Thompson – former NBA player
- Bill Walton – National Basketball Association MVP, member of the Basketball Hall of Fame, broadcaster
- Earl Watson – former National Basketball Association player and coach
- Russell Westbrook – National Basketball Association player; Most Valuable Player and Olympic gold medalist
- Jamaal Wilkes – former National Basketball Association player; four-time NBA champion; member of the Basketball Hall of Fame
- Natalie Williams – former Women's National Basketball Association and Olympic player; general manager for Las Vegas Aces
- Lisa Willis – former Women's National Basketball Association player and coach
- Trevor Wilson – former National Basketball Association player

==== American football / gridiron ====
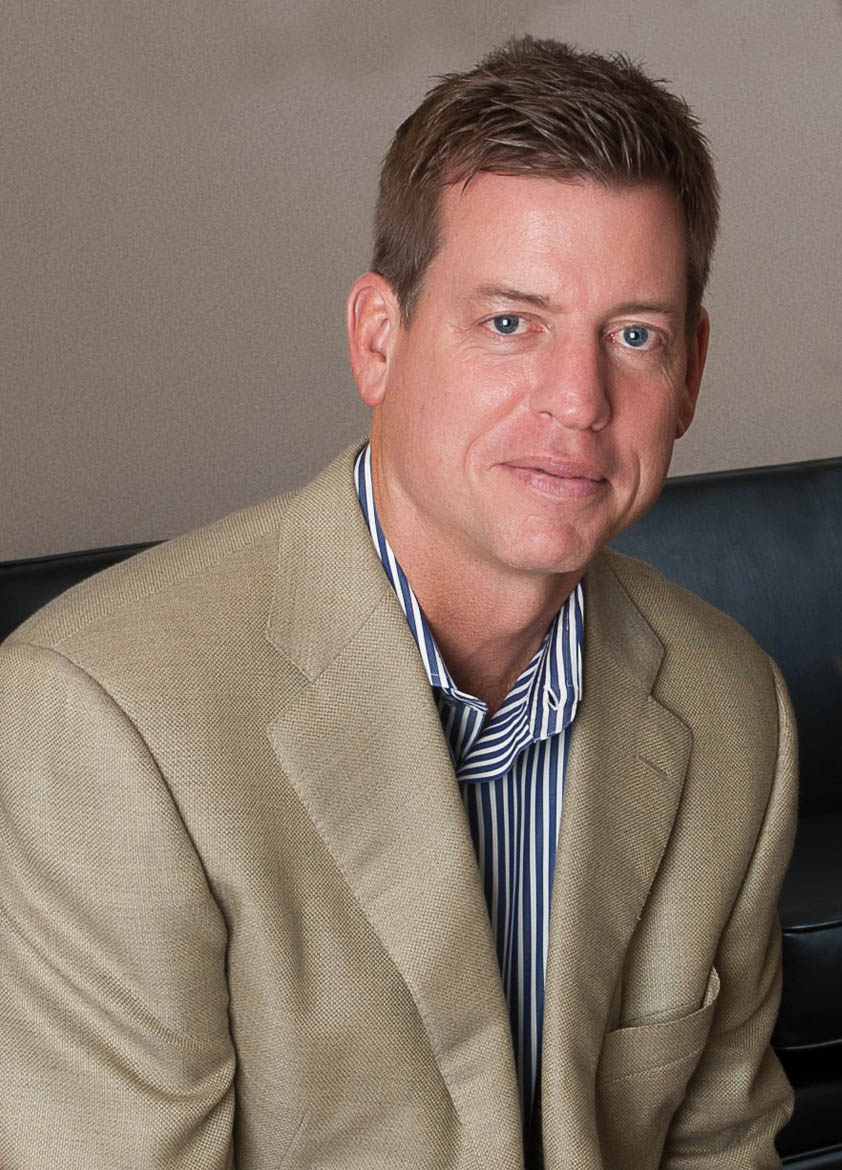
Troy Aikman, Hall of Famer and three-time NFL Super Bowl champion

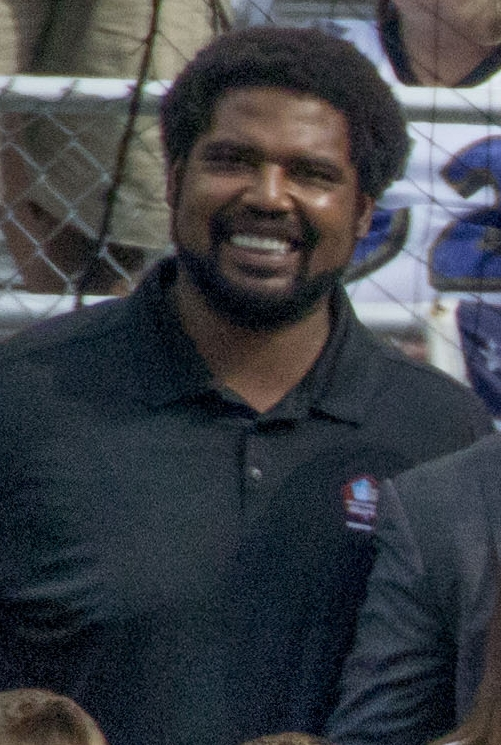
Jonathan Ogden, Hall of Famer and eleven-time Pro Bowler

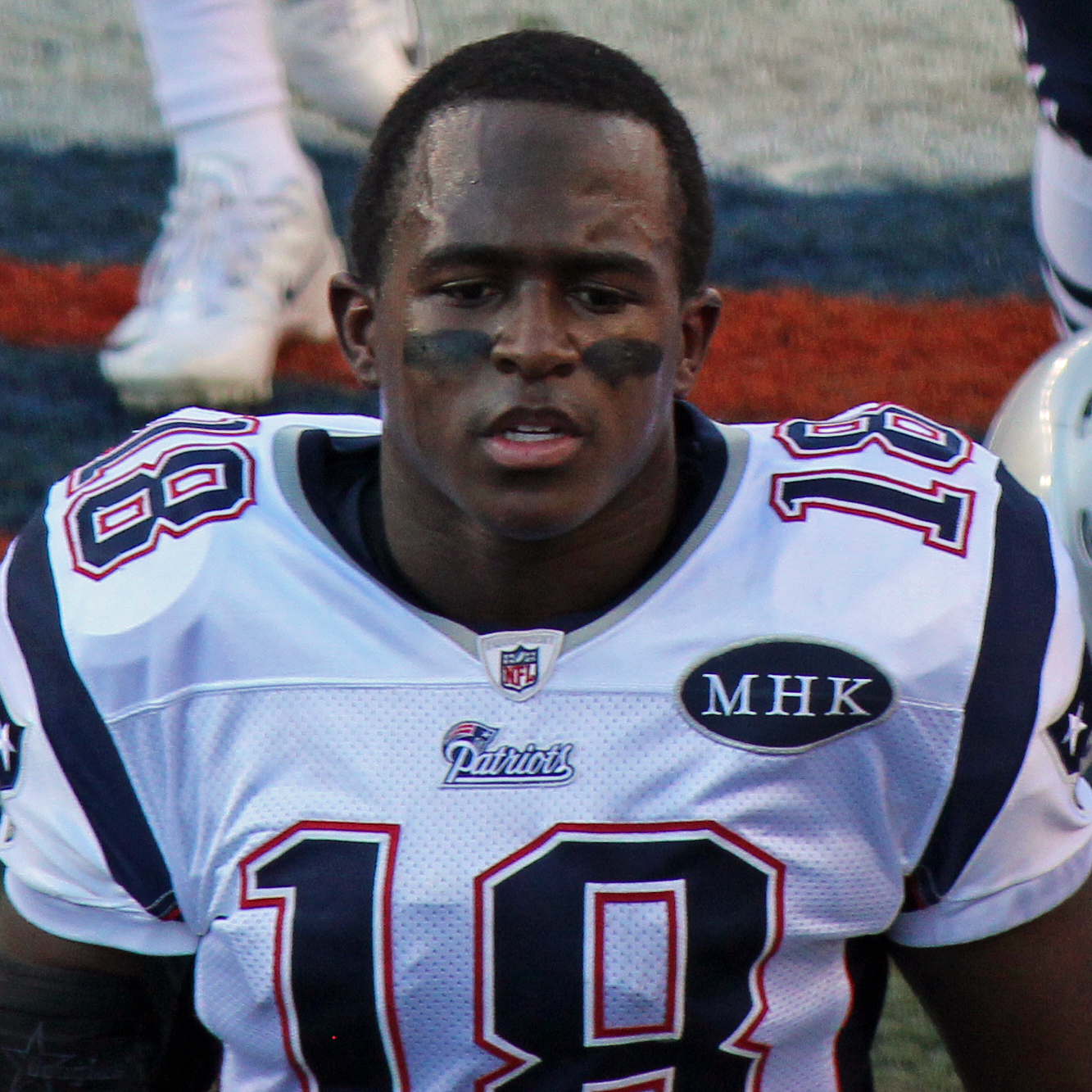
Matthew Slater, ten-time Pro Bowler and three-time NFL Super Bowl champion

- Troy Aikman – former NFL player, three-time Super Bowl champion and member of the Pro Football Hall of Fame
- Kermit Alexander – former NFL player, one-time Pro Bowl selection
- Flipper Anderson – former NFL player; holds NFL record for receiving yards in a game
- Zenon Andrusyshyn – former NFL player, Southern Baptist minister
- Bill Armstrong – NFL player
- Dave Ball – former NFL player
- Anthony Barr –Minnesota Vikings linebacker
- Gary Beban – 1967 Heisman Trophy winner; former NFL player
- Drew Bennett – former NFL player
- Steve Bono – former NFL player
- Paul Cameron – football player
- Leo Cantor – NFL football player
- Brandon Chillar – former NFL player
- Kenyon Coleman – NFL player
- Randy Cross – former NFL player; three-time All-Pro selection
- Dave Dalby – former NFL player; one-time Pro Bowl selection
- Bruce Davis – former NFL player, Super Bowl Champion
- Milt Davis – NFL player, First-team All-Pro, Second-team All-Pro, 2× NFL interceptions leader
- Kenny Easley – NFL player; 1984 NFL Defensive Player of the Year
- Irv Eatman – former NFL player
- Donnie Edwards – NFL player
- Allan Ellis – former NFL player; one-time Pro Bowl selection
- Danny Everett – 1988 Olympic gold medalist, 4 × 400 m men's relay
- Kaʻimi Fairbairn – NFL player
- Mike Farr – NFL player; Detroit Lions wide receiver
- Kris Farris – former NFL player
- Tom Fears – former NFL player, member of the Pro Football Hall of Fame
- Rudy Feldman – head football coach at the University of New Mexico, 1968–1973; assistant coach with the San Diego Chargers and the St. Louis Cardinals; director of pro personnel for the Chargers, 1987–1997
- Mike Flanagan – former NFL player
- Bryan Fletcher – former NFL player and Super Bowl champion
- Kai Forbath – NFL player
- DeShaun Foster – former NFL player; San Francisco 49ers running back
- Nesby Glasgow – former American football safety who played 14 seasons in the NFL
- Gaston Green – former NFL player; one-time Pro Bowl selection
- Wally Henry – former NFL player, one-time Pro Bowl selection
- Efren Herrera – former NFL player; All Pro player
- Brett Hundley – former UCLA quarterback
- Jimmy Johnson – former NFL player and member of Pro Football Hall of Fame
- Norm Johnson – former NFL player
- Jimmie Jones – gridiron football player
- Maurice Jones-Drew – former NFL player (2011); NFL rushing yards leader and three time All-Pro selection (did not graduate)
- Joe Keeble – NFL player
- Charlie Kendall – former American Football League player
- Eric Kendricks – NFL player
- Billy Kilmer – former NFL player, American Football Association commissioner, member of the College Football Hall of Fame
- Travis Kirschke – former NFL player
- Fulton Kuykendall – former NFL player
- Carnell Lake – former NFL player
- John Lee – NCAA-record breaking, two-time All-American placekicker
- Marcedes Lewis – NFL player
- Cliff Livingston – former NFL player
- Duval Love – former NFL player, New Orleans Saints offensive tackle
- Tommy Maddox – former NFL player
- Ricky Manning – former NFL player
- Frank Manumaleuga – former NFL player
- Jim Matheny – football player
- Freeman McNeil – former NFL player, three-time All-Pro selection
- Fred McNeill – former NFL player
- Cade McNown – former NFL player
- Bjorn Merten – All-American
- Jamir Miller – former NFL player, one-time All-Pro selection
- Freddie Mitchell – former NFL player
- Max Montoya – former NFL player, four-time Pro Bowl selection
- Rahim Moore – NFL player for the Denver Broncos
- Ryan Nece – NFL player; Super Bowl champion
- Ken Norton Jr. – former NFL player; three-time Super Bowl champion
- Jonathan Ogden – former NFL player; Super Bowl champion and member of the Pro Football Hall of Fame
- Drew Olson – former NFL player
- Vaughn Parker – former NFL player
- George Paton – NFL executive
- Marvcus Patton – former NFL player
- Don Paul – former NFL player; three-time Pro Bowl selection
- Adam Peters – NFL general manager, Washington Commanders
- Carl Peterson – former general manager, Kansas City Chiefs
- Roman Phifer – former NFL player; three-time Super Bowl champion
- Alex Redmond – NFL player
- Jerry Robinson – former NFL player
- Josh Rosen – Second-team All-Pac-12, Freshman All-American, Pac-12 Freshman Offensive Player of the Year, NFL player
- Jim Salsbury – former NFL player
- Jay Schroeder – former NFL player; one-time Pro Bowl selection
- Mike Seidman – NFL football player
- Brandon Sermons – American football player
- Luis Sharpe – former NFL player; three-time Pro Bowl selection
- Mike Sherrard – former NFL player
- Don Shinnick – former NFL player
- Matthew Slater – former NFL player, eight-time All Pro, ten-time Pro Bowler, and three-time Super Bowl champion
- Kevin Smith – former NFL player
- Ken Snelling – former NFL player
- Al Sparlis – former NFL player, member of the College Football Hall of Fame
- Woody Strode – football player; one of the first African-American players to integrate the NFL and film actor
- Xavier Su'a-Filo – offensive lineman
- Harry Thompson – NFL player
- Glen Titensor – former NFL player
- Mark Tuinei – former NFL player; three-time Super Bowl champion
- Eric Turner – former NFL player; one-time All-Pro selection
- Wendell Tyler – former NFL player, one-time Pro Bowl selection
- Alterraun Verner – NFL player
- Bruce Walker – defensive end, NFL
- James Washington – former NFL player
- Kenny Washington – former football player; one of the first African-American players to integrate the NFL
- Bob Waterfield – former NFL player and member of the Pro Football Hall of Fame
- Dick Witcher – former NFL player

==== Golf ====
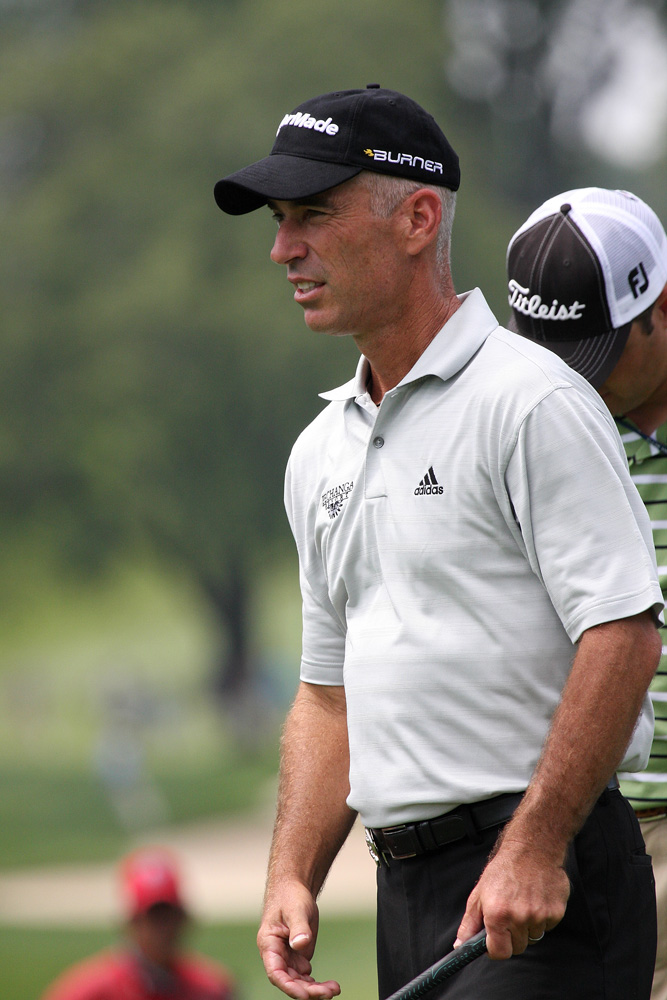
Corey Pavin

- Patrick Cantlay – professional golfer
- Charlotte Mayorkas – professional golfer and golf instructor
- John Merrick – professional golfer
- Corey Pavin – professional golfer, 1995 U.S. Open champion, 2010 Ryder Cup captain
- Tom Pernice Jr. – professional golfer
- Monte Scheinblum – 1992 U.S. National and World Long Drive Champion
- Duffy Waldorf – professional golfer

==== Gymnastics ====
- Alyssa Beckerman – gymnast
- Mohini Bhardwaj – Olympic silver medalist in gymnastics
- Tim Daggett – gymnast and 1984 Olympic gold medalist
- Philip "Phil" Erenberg – gymnast and Olympic silver medalist
- Danusia Francis – London 2012 reserve for the British team; Tokyo 2020 member of Jamaican team
- Mitch Gaylord – gymnast; 1984 Olympic gold medalist
- Brian Ginsberg – two-time US junior national gymnastics champion, won gold medals at both the 1983 Pan American Games and the 1987 Pan American Games
- Ron Kaplan – Israeli Olympic gymnast
- Madison Kocian – 2016 Olympic gold medalist, 2015 world uneven bars champion
- Mattie Larson – 2010 World Championships team silver medalist
- Christine "Peng Peng" Lee – Canadian artistic gymnast
- Anna Li – 2012 Olympic reserve and 2011 World Championships reserve
- Emma Malabuyo - 2024 Olympian representing the Philippines
- Kristen Maloney – 2000 Olympics team bronze medalist
- Katelyn Ohashi – 2013 American Cup winner
- Samantha Peszek – 2008 Olympic team silver medalist, 2007 World Championships team gold medalist, 3-time NCAA individual champion and 17-time All-American
- Jennifer Pinches – 2012 British Olympic team member, 2010 and 2011 British World Championships team member
- Kyla Ross – 2012 Olympic gold medalist (team gold), 2014 World Championships team gold medalist
- Tasha Schwikert – 2000 Olympics team bronze medalist
- Sharon Shapiro – gymnast
- Kerri Strug – 1996 Olympic Champion (team gold)
- Peter Vidmar – gymnast; 1984 Olympic gold medalist
- Jordyn Wieber – 2012 Olympic Champion (team gold), three-time World Championships medalist (2011 team gold, 2011 all around gold, 2011 balance beam bronze)
- Valerie Zimring – Olympic rhythmic gymnast

==== Association football / soccer ====
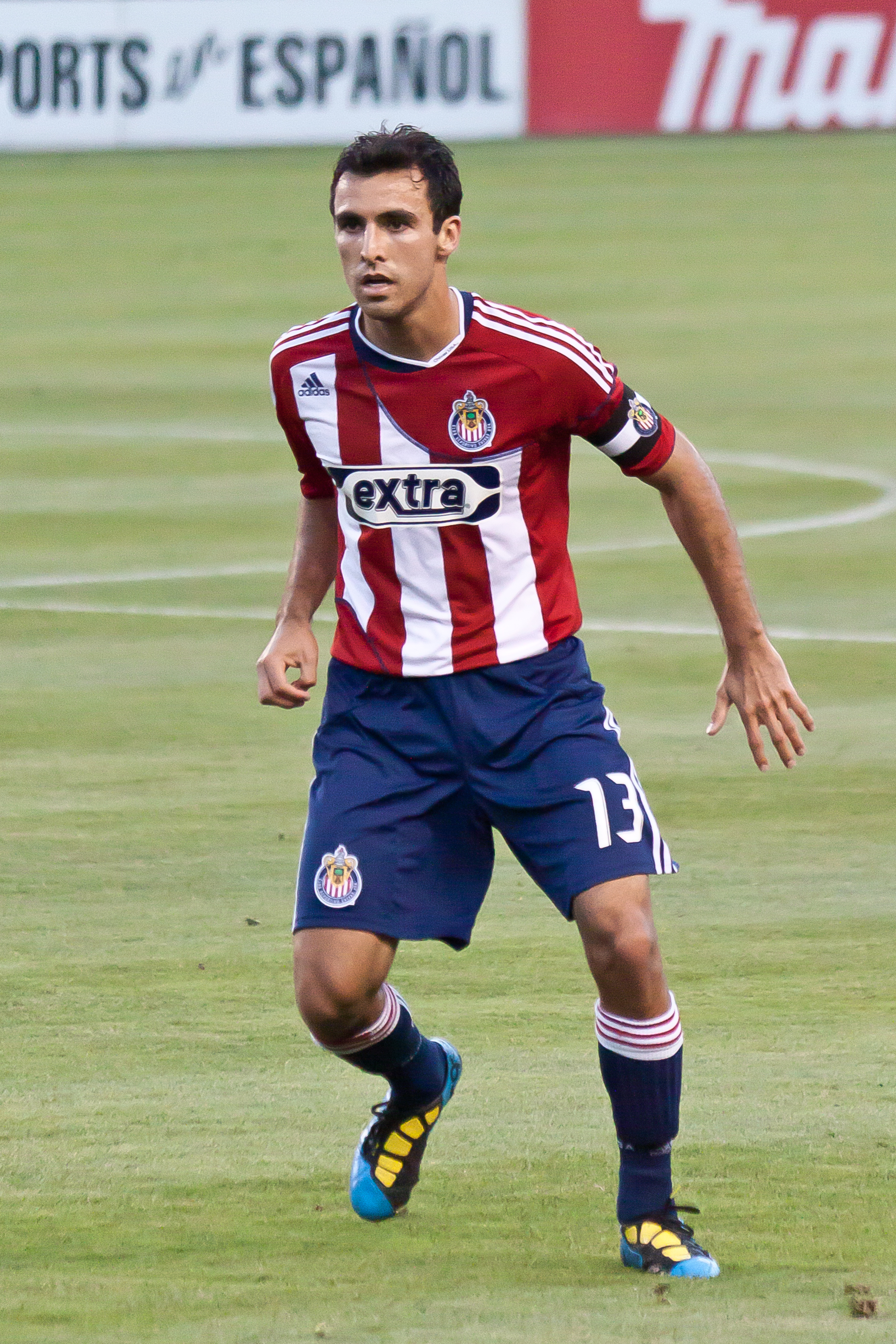
Jonathan Bornstein

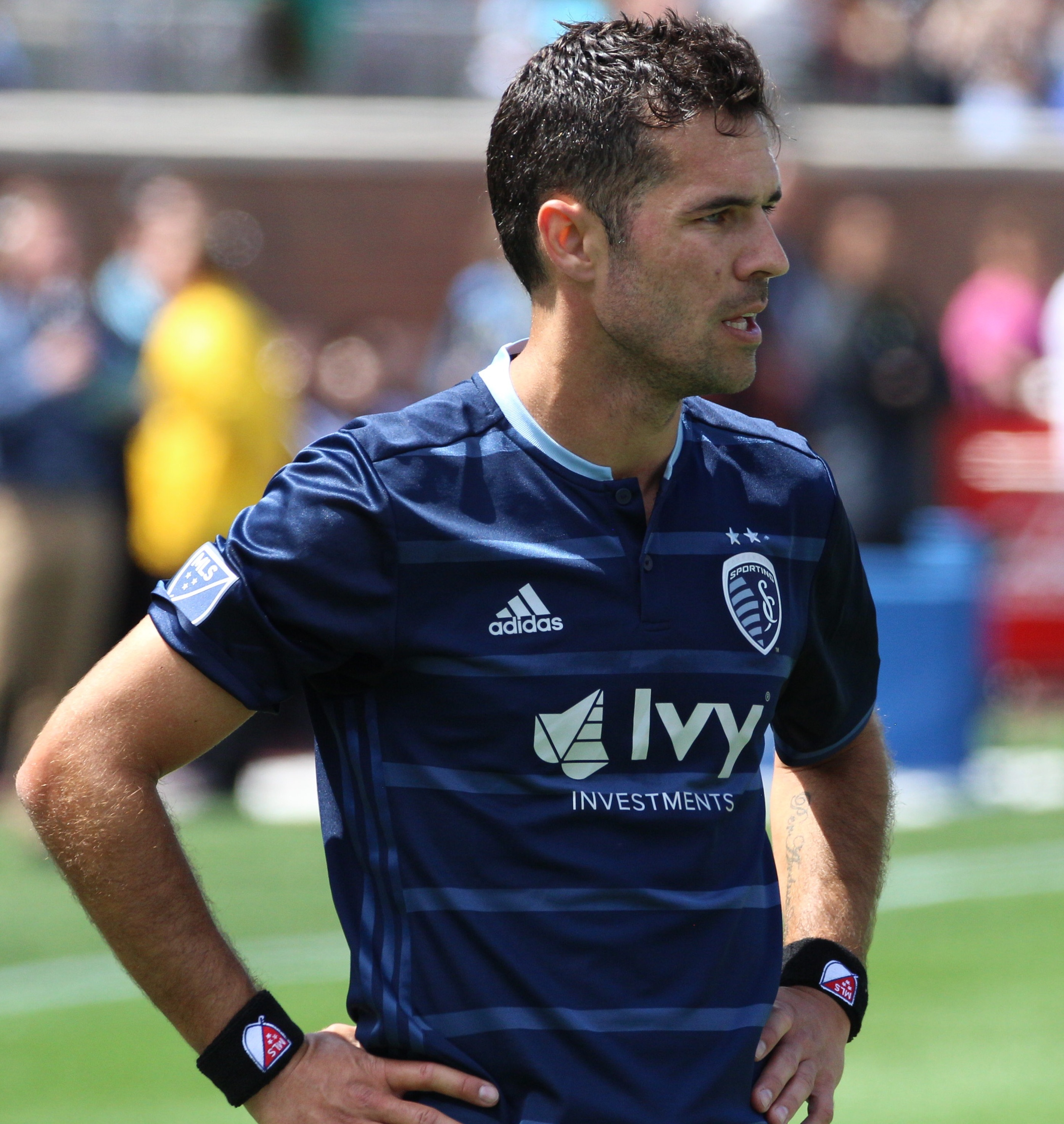
Benny Feilhaber

- Danesha Adams – NWSL defender, Sky Blue FC
- Lauren Barnes – NWSL defender, Seattle Reign FC
- Chad Barrett – Major League Soccer forward; Los Angeles Galaxy
- Carlos Bocanegra – Chivas USA centre back; vice captain, U.S. men's national soccer team
- Jonathan Bornstein – American-Israeli soccer player; Chicago Fire FC; captain, U.S. men's national soccer team
- Zakiya Bywaters – NWSL forward, Chicago Red Stars
- Abby Dahlkemper – NWSL defender, Western New York Flash
- Caprice Dydasco – Washington Spirit
- Michael Enfield – played in MLS
- David Estrada – forward, midfielder for Seattle Sounders FC of Major League Soccer
- Benny Feilhaber – Sporting Kansas City Midfielder; 2013 MLS Cup champion and U.S. men's national soccer team
- Jessie Fleming – Canada women's national soccer team
- Brad Friedel – Premier League soccer player; 2002 U.S. Soccer Athlete of the Year
- Kevin Hartman – Major League Soccer player; two-time MLS Cup champion and 1999 MLS Goalkeeper of the Year
- Jaime Hipp – water polo goalkeeper; Olympian
- Lauren Holiday – NWSL forward, FC Kansas City; member, U.S. women's national soccer team
- Patrick Ianni – defender of Houston Dynamo of Major League Soccer, U.S. Olympian for 2008 Beijing Olympics
- Cobi Jones – Major League Soccer player; two-time MLS Cup champion and 1998 U.S. Soccer Athlete of the Year
- Sarah Killion – number 2 pick in NWSL draft, plays for Sky Blue FC
- Kristina Larsen – NWSL forward, Seattle Reign FC
- Sydney Leroux – NWSL forward, Boston Breakers; member, U.S. women's national soccer team
- Louise Lieberman – soccer coach and former player
- Sam Mewis – U.S. women's national soccer team
- Megan Oyster – Washington Spirit
- Mallory Pugh – U.S. women's national soccer team
- Matt Reis – Major League Soccer player
- Nick Rimando – Major League Soccer player; MLS Cup champion
- Katelyn Rowland – FC Kansas City
- Sigi Schmid – soccer coach and member of the National Soccer Hall of Fame
- Scot Thompson – Major League Soccer player; MLS Cup champion
- Peter Vagenas – Major League Soccer player; MLS Cup champion
- Marvell Wynne – Major League Soccer player; United States men's national soccer team player
- McCall Zerboni – NWSL midfielder; Western New York Flash

==== Tennis ====
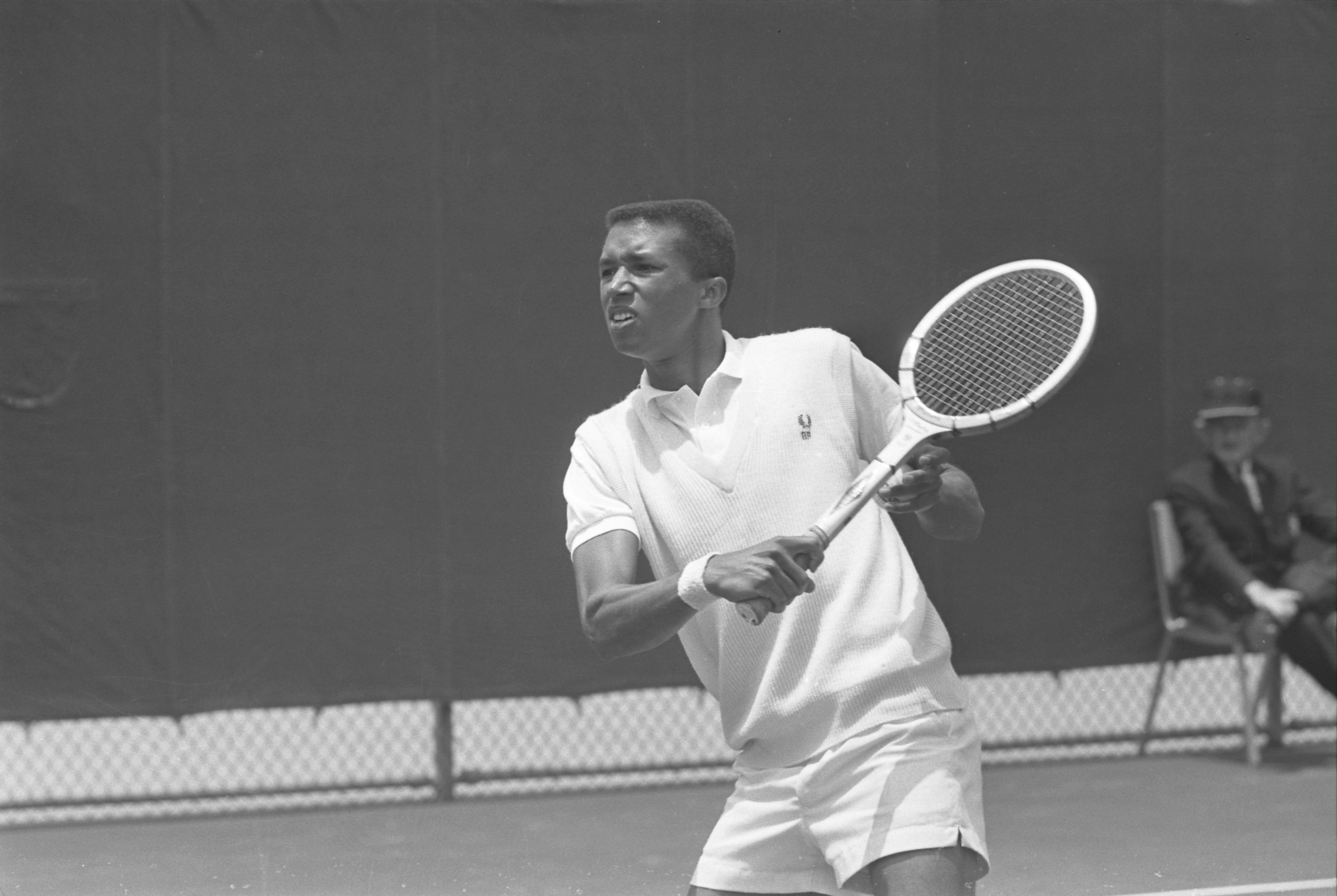
Arthur Ashe, the first and only black male tennis player to ever win the titles at Wimbledon, the US Open, and the Australian Open

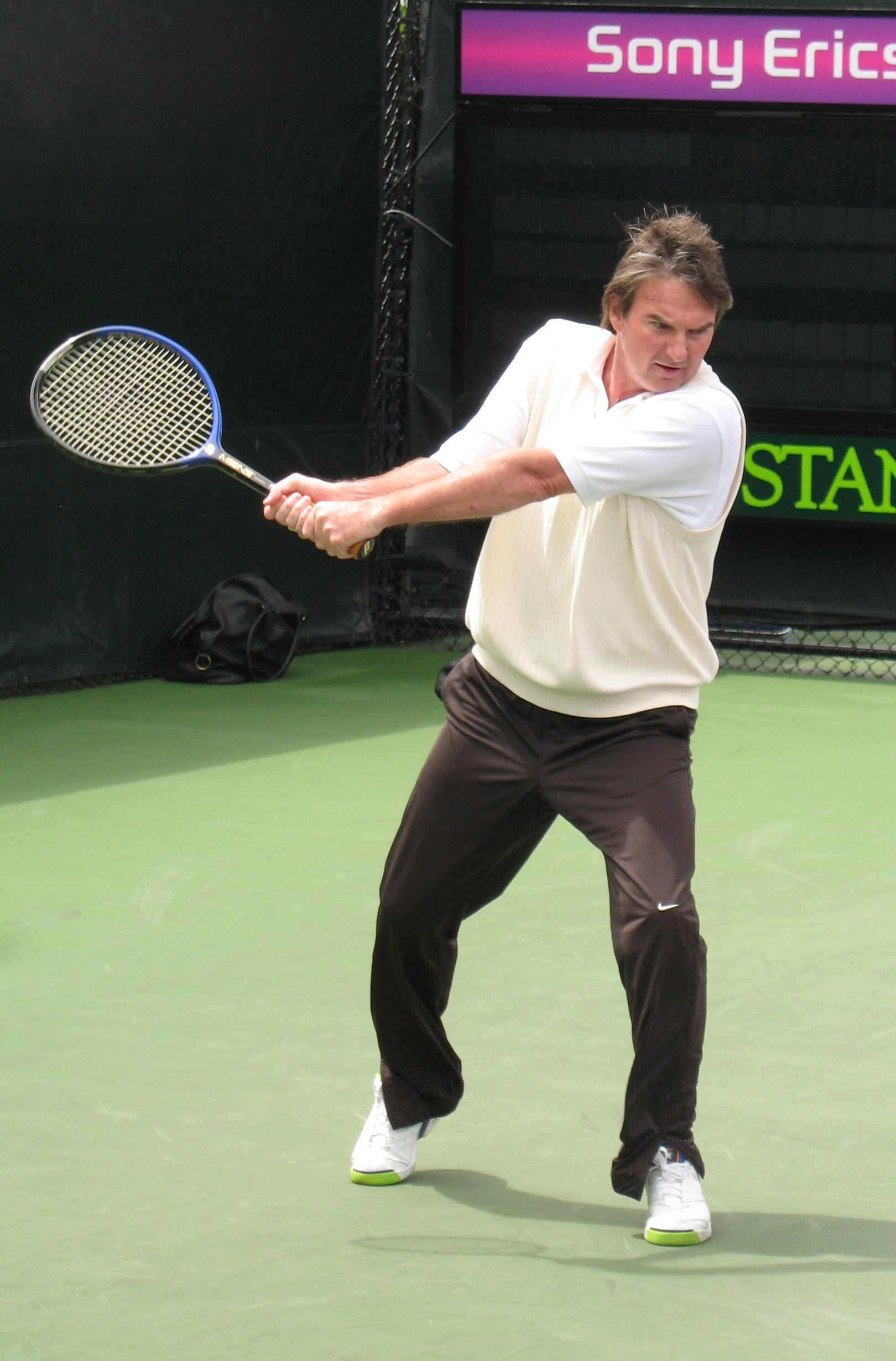
Jimmy Connors

- Arthur Ashe – tennis player (ranked as high as # 1) and social activist; Wimbledon champion and member of the International Tennis Hall of Fame
- Jimmy Connors – tennis player (ranked as high as # 1); two-time Wimbledon champion and member of the International Tennis Hall of Fame
- Herbert Flam – tennis player (ranked as high as # 4)
- Zack Fleishman – professional tennis player
- Allen Fox – tennis player (ranked as high as # 4) and coach
- Mike Franks – professional tennis player
- Justin Gimelstob – professional tennis player
- Julius Heldman – professional tennis player was the National Junior Tennis Champion in 1936
- Anita Kanter – tennis player ranked in world top 10
- Tom Karp – tennis player
- Jeff Klaparda – professional tennis player, won the 1984 USTA National Amateur Clay Courts title
- Steve Krulevitz – professional tennis player
- Larry Nagler – tennis player, 1960 NCAA Tennis Singles Champion and Doubles Champion, in 1962 ranked 11th in the US in singles, inducted into the ITA Hall of Fame and the UCLA Athletics Hall of Fame
- Kimberly Po – professional tennis player
- Brian Teacher – professional tennis player (ranked as high as # 7); Australian Open champion; and coach
- Eliot Teltscher – professional tennis player (ranked as high as # 6)
- Van Winitsky – professional tennis player ranked as high as # 7 in doubles

==== Track and field ====
- Evelyn Ashford – Olympic track and field athlete and multiple gold medalist
- Ato Boldon – Olympic track and field athlete 1997 200 meter World Champion and four-time Olympic sprint medalist
- Gail Devers – track and field runner; multiple Olympic gold medalist
- Danny Everett – Olympic bronze medalist in track and field
- Millard Hampton – track and field athlete, gold (4X100 relay) and silver (200 meters) medalist in the 1976 Montreal Olympics
- Dawn Harper – 2008 Olympics 100m hurdles gold medalist
- Joanna Hayes – Olympic gold medalist track and field 100 m hurdles record holder
- Monique Henderson – track and field runner; Olympic gold medalist in 4 × 400 m relay
- Rafer Johnson – several-time world-record holder in the decathlon, and gold medalist at the 1960 Summer Olympics
- Florence Griffith Joyner – Olympic gold medalist and world record holder in 100 meter race
- Jackie Joyner-Kersee – track and field athlete, multiple Olympic gold medalist and world record holder in the heptathlon
- Meb Keflezighi – Olympic silver medalist, NCAA championships and New York City Marathon winner
- Steve Lewis – Olympic gold medalist in track and field
- Andre Phillips – track and field athlete, 400 meter hurdles gold medalist in the 1988 Seoul Olympics
- Mike Powell – former track and field athlete, current coach and holder of the long jump world record
- Yang Chuan-kwang (also known as C.K. Yang) – former world-record holder in the decathlon, silver medalist in the decathlon in the 1960 Summer Olympics; first man to score over 9,000 points (using the tables at the time)
- Kevin Young – Olympic gold medalist in track and field, current world record holder in 400 meters hurdles

==== Volleyball ====
- Karch Kiraly – volleyball player and coach; only person to win Olympic gold medals in both indoor and beach volleyball
- Holly McPeak – beach volleyball player and Olympic bronze medalist
- Stein Metzger
- Sinjin Smith
- Elaine Youngs – beach volleyball player and Olympic bronze medalist

==== Water polo ====
- James Ferguson – 1972 Olympic bronze medalist, USA Water Polo Hall of Fame
- Natalie Golda – water polo player; Olympian
- Sienna Green – water polo Olympian
- Jillian Kraus – water polo player
- Adam Krikorian – water polo player and coach; won 14 national titles
- Monte Nitzkowski – Olympic water polo coach and swimmer
- Josh Samuels – Olympic water polo player
- Jovan Vavic – former head coach of the USC men's and women's water polo teams

==== Other ====
- Glenn Cowan – table tennis player
- Lisa Fernandez – Olympic softball gold medalist
- Brian Goodell – swimmer; nine NCAA individual championships, two-time Olympic champion, and former world record-holder
- Tommy Kendall – race car driver and television analyst
- Erwin Klein – table tennis player
- Dan Kutler – Olympic swimmer
- Michelle Kwan – world champion figure skater; record nine-time U.S. National Champion
- Ken Pavia – former sports agent, founder of MMAagents Sports Agency, former CEO of India's first MMA Promotion Super Fight League
- Dot Richardson – softball player, Olympic gold medalist
- Mark Schultz (attended) – 3x NCAA Champion, Olympic and world champion wrestler
- Doug Shaffer – platform diving, U.S. National champion, NCAA Diver of the Year, head coach at UCLA, Minnesota and LSU
- Tim Thackrey – US National Team and Pan Am Games gold medalist

=== Miscellaneous ===
- Rodney Alcala – convicted rapist and serial killer active from 1968 to 1979, aka the "Dating Game Killer" for his successful appearance on The Dating Game
- Allen Cunningham – professional poker player
- Giada De Laurentiis – Food Network chef (Every Day Italian)
- Lori Dennis – interior designer and lecturer
- Chris "Jesus" Ferguson – World Series of Poker main event winner and poker professional
- Harvey J. Fields – Reform rabbi
- Jonathan Gold – Pulitzer Prize-winning food critic
- Kelly Goto – User experience design researcher and author of Web Redsign, Workflow that Works
- Stephen Francis Jones – architect known for high-end restaurant designs
- Kang Dong-suk – yachtsman, first Korean solo circumnavigator
- Jill Kinmont – educator, quadriplegic, alpine ski racer in the 1950s
- Ida B. Kinney – civil rights activist
- Ralph Lazo – civil rights activist, only known non-spouse and non-Japanese American who voluntarily relocated to a World War II Japanese American internment camp
- Nana Meriwether – Miss Maryland USA 2012, Miss USA 2012
- Donn Moomaw – Presbyterian minister, member of the College Football Hall of Fame
- K. Patrick Okura – Japanese American psychologist and civil rights activist
- Zoltan Pali – architect
- Brian R. Price – author, editor, publisher, martial-arts instructor of the Italian school of swordsmanship, reconstructive armorer, and dissertation fellow in history at the University of North Texas
- Ubol Ratana – princess of Thailand
- Eva Ritvo – psychiatrist, author and TV/radio personality
- Kelly Rondestvedt – hereditary princess of Saxe-Coburg and Gotha
- Lila Rose – activist and president of Live Action)
- Daniel Thompson – inventor of the automatic bagel maker and the folding ping pong table
- J. Warner Wallace – homicide detective and Christian apologist
- Prince Chatri Chalerm Yukol of Thailand

== Notable faculty ==
=== Nobel laureates ===
- Paul D. Boyer – professor of chemistry; recipient of the 1997 Nobel Prize in Chemistry
- James M. Buchanan – professor of economics; recipient of 1986 Nobel Prize in Economics
- Donald Cram (1919–2001) – professor of chemistry; recipient of the 1987 Nobel Prize in Chemistry
- Andrea M. Ghez – astrophysicist and professor in the Department of Physics and Astronomy; in 2020, became the fourth woman to be awarded the Nobel Prize in Physics
- Louis J. Ignarro – professor of molecular and medical pharmacology; recipient of the 1998 Nobel Prize in Medicine
- Willard Libby (1908–1980) – professor of chemistry; recipient of the 1960 Nobel Prize in Chemistry
- Bertrand Russell (1872–1970) – mathematician and philosopher; recipient of the 1950 Nobel Prize in Literature
- Julian Schwinger (1918–1994) – professor of physics; recipient of the 1965 Nobel Prize in Physics
- Lloyd Shapley – professor of economics; recipient of the 2012 Nobel Prize in Economics

=== Administrators ===
The following persons led the Southern branch of the University of California from 1919 to 1950 as provost, and after 1952 led the University of California at Los Angeles as chancellor:

==== Provosts (1919–1950) ====
No.	Portrait	Provost	Term start	Term end	Refs.
1		Ernest Carroll Moore (Note: Provost of the University of California, Southern Branch)	July 21, 1919	June 30, 1936	
2		Earle Raymond Hedrick	March 19, 1937	June 30, 1942	
3		Clarence Addison Dykstra	February 1, 1945	May 6, 1950	

==== Chancellors (1952–present) ====
No.	Portrait	Chancellor	Term start	Term end	Refs.
1		Raymond B. Allen (Note: First chancellor of UCLA)	July 1, 1952	August 31, 1959	
2		Vern Oliver Knudsen	September 1, 1959	June 30, 1960	
3		Franklin David Murphy	July 1, 1960	August 31, 1968	
4		Charles E. Young	September 1, 1968	June 30, 1997	
5		Albert Carnesale	July 1, 1997	June 30, 2006	
acting		Norman Abrams	July 1, 2006	July 31, 2007	
6		Gene D. Block	August 1, 2007	July 31, 2024	
Interim		Darnell Hunt	August 1, 2024	December 31, 2024	
7		Julio Frenk	January 1, 2025	present	

Table notes:

=== Business ===
- Paul Habibi – professor of real estate and finance at UCLA Anderson School of Management
- Mark A.R. Kleiman – professor of public policy, noted expert on crime and drug policy
- William Ouchi – professor of management and best-selling author
- Richard Riordan – professor of business at UCLA Anderson School of Management

=== Medicine ===
- Alistair Cochran – professor of pathology and surgery
- Mario Deng – professor of medicine in the David Geffen School of Medicine
- Michael S. Gottlieb – first physician to diagnose AIDS
- Roberta Gottlieb – oncologist
- David Ho – AIDS researcher
- Sarah Meeker Jensen – FAIA, founder of Jensen Partners Healthcare Planning
- Howard Judd – menopause expert and medical researcher
- Martha Kirkpatrick (1925–2015) – clinical professor of psychiatry
- Kimberly J. Lee – reconstructive surgeon
- Linda Liau – W. Eugene Stern Chair of the Department of Neurosurgery
- Courtney Lyder – expert in gerontology; first black dean of the UCLA School of Nursing
- No-Hee Park, DMD, PhD – dean, UCLA School of Dentistry and notable researcher of oral (head and neck) cancer and aging research
- Patrick Soon-Shiong – executive director, UCLA Wireless Health Institute

=== Politics ===
- Michael Dukakis – professor of policy studies, former governor of Massachusetts and 1988 presidential candidate
- Al Gore – visiting professor, 45th vice president of the United States
- Larry Pressler – teacher and visiting fellow, former senator from South Dakota

=== Science and technology ===
- George O. Abell (1927–1983) – professor of astronomy
- Asad Ali Abidi – professor of electrical engineering; pioneer of CMOS RF circuits; member of the National Academy of Engineering
- Margaret W. "Hap" Brennecke – NASA metallurgist
- M. C. Frank Chang – professor of electrical engineering; member of the National Academy of Engineering
- Alonzo Church – known for the lambda calculus used in computing
- Steven Clarke – professor of chemistry and biochemistry; pioneer in protein repair in aging (L-isoaspartyl methyltransferase)
- Vijay K. Dhir – dean of the UCLA Henry Samueli School of Engineering and Applied Science; professor of mechanical and aerospace engineering
- François Diederich – professor of chemistry
- Paul Eggert – professor of computer science
- David Eisenberg – professor of chemistry and biochemistry, and of biological chemistry; director of the UCLA-DOE Institute for Genomics and Proteomics
- Sergio Ferrara – professor of physics; co-discovered supergravity in 1976
- Rajit Gadh – professor of mechanical and aerospace engineering; founder and director of UCLA Smart Grid Energy Research Center and Wireless Internet for Mobile Enterprise Consortium
- William Gelbart – professor of chemistry and biochemistry
- Andrea Ghez – professor of astronomy; expert in the Galactic Center and adaptive optics; Crafoord Prize recipient
- Sheila Greibach – professor of computer science, known for the Greibach normal form
- A. M. Harun-ar-Rashid – physicist; member, Nobel Committee for Physics
- Steve Horvath – professor of human genetics
- Kendall Houk – professor of chemistry
- Tatsuo Itoh – professor of electrical engineering; member of the National Academy of Engineering
- Michael E. Jung – professor of chemistry
- Richard Kaner – professor of chemistry
- Alan Kay – professor of computer science; Turing Award laureate
- John Kim – professor of mechanical and aerospace engineering; member of the National Academy of Engineering
- Margaret Kivelson – professor of space physics; expert in planetary magnetospheres; member of the National Academy of Sciences
- Leonard Kleinrock – professor of computer science; Internet pioneer; recipient of the 2007 National Medal of Science
- William Scott Klug – professor of mechanical and aerospace engineering; killed in the 2016 UCLA shooting
- Raphael David Levine – professor of chemistry
- Tung Hua Lin – professor of civil and environmental engineering; designer of China's first twin-engine aircraft
- Seymour Lubetzky – professor of library and information science
- Donald A. Martin – professor of mathematics and philosophy
- Mildred Esther Mathias – professor of botany (1962 – 1974), eponym of the campus' Mildred E. Mathias Botanical Garden
- William V. Mayer – professor of zoology
- Carlo Montemagno – associate director, California Nanosystems Institute; founding department chair, Department of Biomedical Engineering; Carol and Roy Doumani Professor of Biomedical Engineering (2001–2006); "father of bionanotechnology"
- Debra A. Murphy – professor emerita at the University of California, Los Angeles in the Department of Psychiatry
- Henry John Orchard – professor of electrical engineering; pioneer of the field of filter design
- Mangalore Anantha Pai – power engineer, Shanti Swarup Bhatnagar laureate
- Stott Parker – professor of computer science
- Judea Pearl – professor of computer science; pioneer of Bayesian networks and the probabilistic approach to artificial intelligence; Turing Award laureate
- Roberto Peccei – professor of physics; former dean of the UCLA Division of Physical Sciences; Sakurai Prize recipient
- Theodore M. Porter – professor of history of science
- Abraham Robinson – professor of mathematics and philosophy
- Leonard H. Rome – professor of biochemistry; former dean of the medical school
- Joseph Rudnick – professor of physics; former dean of the UCLA Division of Physical Sciences
- Amit Sahai – professor of computer science
- Arnold Scheibel – professor of psychiatry and neuroanatomy
- Lloyd Shapley – professor of mathematics; known for the Shapley value in game theory
- Elizabeth Stern – professor of epidemiology
- Ernst G. Straus – professor of mathematics
- Terence Tao – professor of mathematics; Fields Medalist in 2006; Crafoord Prize recipient
- Sarah Tolbert – professor of chemistry
- Jean L. Turner – professor of astronomy and physics
- Edward Wright – professor of astronomy; expert in cosmology and infrared astronomy; member of the National Academy of Sciences
- Jeffrey Zink – professor of chemistry and biochemistry

=== Social science, arts and humanities ===
- Rogers Albritton – late professor of philosophy
- Perry Anderson – Marxist historian; professor emeritus of History and Sociology
- Carol Aneshensel – sociologist; professor and vice chair for the Department of Community Health Sciences in the School of Public Health
- Joyce Appleby – U.S. historian; specialist in intellectual history and the legacy of liberalism
- Ann Bergren – professor of Greek literature, winner in 1988 of the university's Distinguished Teaching Award
- William Bodiford – professor of Japanese and Buddhist studies
- James M. Buchanan – professor of economics; recipient of 1986 Nobel Prize in Economics
- Tyler Burge – professor, fellow, American Academy of Arts and Sciences
- Kenny Burrell – professor of jazz studies; jazz guitarist and composer
- Rudolf Carnap – late professor of the philosophy of language
- Sue-Ellen Case – professor of critical studies in theater
- Alonzo Church – pioneer in the philosophy of language and computer science
- James Smoot Coleman – Africanist; founded the UCLA African Studies Center
- Brian Copenhaver – emeritus historian of philosophy
- Denis Cosgrove – Alexander von Humboldt Professor of Geography
- James Cuno – director of the Grunwald Center for Graphic Arts at the Hammer Museum
- Angela Davis – assistant professor of philosophy, fired in 1969 by the Board of Regents and California Governor Ronald Reagan for her membership in the Communist Party
- Jared Diamond – professor of geography and physiology, Pulitzer Prize-winning author of Guns, Germs and Steel: The Fate of Human Societies
- Keith Donnellan – late professor of philosophy
- Annalisa Enrile – clinical professor and social worker
- Frederick Erickson – professor emeritus of educational anthropology
- Kit Fine – former professor of philosophy
- Philippa Foot – late professor of philosophy
- Steven Forness – Professor of Psychiatry and Biobehavioral Sciences
- Andrea Fraser – professor of interdisciplinary studio
- Saul Friedländer – European historian; specialist in Holocaust studies
- Lukas Foss – late professor of music composition
- Lowell Gallagher – literary theorist
- James Gimzewski – physicist and nanotechnology pioneer
- Carlo Ginzburg – European historian; pioneer of microhistory
- Juan Gómez-Quiñones – U.S. historian; specialist in Chicano history
- Lev Hakak – professor of Hebrew Language and Literature at UCLA
- N. Katherine Hayles – literary critic
- Barbara Herman – professor of philosophy
- James N. Hill (1934–1997) – processualist archaeologist
- Thomas Hines – architectural historian; professor emeritus
- Darnell Hunt (PhD UCLA) – professor of Sociology and African American Studies, dean of Social Sciences
- Sylvia Hurtado – distinguished professor of education
- Neil Peter Jampolis – professor of theater design; Tony Award-winning designer; director and designer of theater, dance, and opera
- Donald Kalish – late professor of philosophy
- Abraham Kaplan – late professor of philosophy
- David Kaplan – professor of the philosophy of language
- Edmond Keller – professor of political science; Africanist
- Harold Kelley (1921–2003) – professor of psychology; social psychologist
- Robin Kelley (PhD UCLA 1987) – distinguished professor and Gary B. Nash Endowed Chair in U.S. History at UCLA
- Mark Kleiman – professor of public policy, expert on crime and drug policy
- Peter Kollock (1959–2009) – associate professor of sociology, specialist in collaboration and online participation in virtual communities
- Barbara Kruger – professor of new genres, recipient of the Leone D’Or award from the Venice Biennale
- Peter Ladefoged – professor of linguistics, specialist in phonetics
- Deborah Nadoolman Landis – professor of costume design; Oscar-nominated costume designer of Coming to America; founding director of the David C. Copley Center for Costume Design
- David Kellogg Lewis – former assistant professor of philosophy
- Ole Ivar Lovaas – professor of psychology, specialist in applied behavior analysis therapy for autism
- Michael Mann – professor of sociology; author of The Sources of Social Power volumes I and II
- Mwesa Isaiah Mapoma – Zambian musicologist
- Julián Marías – philosopher, opponent of Francisco Franco, author of History of Philosophy
- Valerie Matsumoto – historian specializing in Asian American history
- Thom Mayne – professor of architecture, architect, co-founder of firm named Morphosis
- Susan McClary – musicologist; prominent in the new-musicology movement; MacArthur Fellow; works have been translated into over twelve languages; wrote Feminine Endings: Music, Gender, and Sexuality
- Vasa Mihich – professor of design and media arts; artist and sculptor
- Richard Montague – late professor of philosophy
- Charles Moore – professor of architecture, author and architect, Beverly Hills Civic Center
- Richard Thacker Morris (1917–1981) – chairman of the sociology department, author
- Donald Neuen – professor of choral studies; conductor; apprentice of Robert Shaw
- Calvin Normore – professor of philosophy
- Karen Orren – professor of political science; noted for her work in American political development
- Catherine Opie – professor of photography and recipient of the Guggenheim Fellowship
- Terence Parsons – professor of philosophy
- John Perry – former professor of philosophy
- Lari Pittman – distinguished professor of painting
- Hans Reichenbach – late professor of philosophy
- Amy Richlin – professor in Department of Classics
- Amy Rowat – associate professor of biophysics and Marcie H. Rothman Presidential Chair in Food Studies
- Walter H. Rubsamen – professor of musicology
- Teofilo Ruiz – European historian; specialist in medieval history
- Bertrand Russell – former professor of philosophy; taught as a guest lecturer for one year
- David Schaberg – dean of Humanities
- Arnold Schoenberg – professor of music; composer
- Seana Shiffrin – professor of philosophy and law known for her work in legal and moral philosophy
- Leo Smit – late professor in music
- Thomas Sowell – professor of economics
- Shelley Taylor – professor of psychology; social psychologist
- Dominic Thomas – chair of the department of French and Francophone Studies at UCLA
- Helen B. Thompson – professor of home economics
- Amy Villarejo – chair of the Department of Film, Television, and Digital Media; professor
- Josef von Sternberg – taught film aesthetics
- Eugen Weber – historian; author of Peasants Into Frenchmen
- Luc E. Weber – rector emeritus of the University of Geneva
- Dixon Wecter – professor of English (1939–1945)
- Louis Jolyon West – professor of psychiatry; specialist in brainwashing
- Gerald Wilson – professor of ethnomusicology, jazz studies; jazz composer, arranger and musician
- Eugene Victor Wolfenstein – professor of political science; author of Psychoanalytic-Marxism: Groundwork
- Roy Bin Wong – professor of history; pioneer in modern Chinese economic history
- Medha Yodh – professor of classical Indian dance
- John Zaller – political scientist; author of The Nature and Origins of Mass Opinion
- Amy Zegart – professor of public policy and U.S. intelligence analyst; author of Spying Blind

=== Athletics ===
==== Athletic directors ====
- Fred Cozens – director of Physical Education and Athletics (1919–1942), first basketball (1919–1921) and football (1919) head coach
- Dan Guerrero, B.A. 1974 – athletic director (2002–2020)
- Martin Jarmond – athletic director (2020–present)
- Wilbur Johns, 1925 – athletic director (1948–1963), men's basketball head coach (1939–1948), basketball player
- J. D. Morgan – athletic director (1963–1979), head tennis coach (1949–1966), tennis player (1938–1941)

==== Basketball coaches ====
- Steve Alford – men's basketball head coach (2013–2018)
- Frank Arnold – men's basketball assistant coach (1971–1975)
- Gene Bartow – men's basketball head coach (1975–1977)
- Larry Brown – men's basketball head coach (1979–1981), member of the Basketball Hall of Fame
- Tasha Butts – women's basketball assistant coach
- Nikki Caldwell – women's basketball head coach (2008–2011)
- Cori Close – women's basketball head coach (2011–present), women's basketball head coach (1993–1995)
- Mick Cronin – men's basketball head coach (2019–present)
- Denny Crum, 1958 – men's basketball assistant coach (1963–1971), player (1956–1958), member of the Basketball Hall of Fame
- Gary Cunningham – men's basketball head coach (1977–1979), basketball player (1960–1962)
- Donny Daniels – men's basketball assistant coach (2003–2010)
- Larry Farmer – men's basketball head coach (1981–1984), basketball player (1970–1973)
- Mark Gottfried – men's basketball assistant coach (1987–1995)
- Jim Harrick – men's basketball head coach (1988–1996)
- Walt Hazzard – men's basketball head coach (1984–1988), basketball player (1961–1964), NBA and Olympic player
- Jack Hirsch – men's basketball assistant coach (1984–1988), player (1961–1964)
- Brad Holland, B.A. 1979 – men's basketball assistant coach (1988–1992), player (1975–1979)
- Michael Holton – men's basketball assistant coach (1996–2001), player (1979–1983)
- Ben Howland – men's basketball head coach (2003–2013); 2006 Pac-10 Coach of the Year
- Chad Kammerer – men's basketball assistant coach
- Kerry Keating – men's basketball assistant coach (2003–2007)
- Steve Lavin – men's basketball head coach (1996–2003)
- Gerald Madkins – men's basketball assistant coach, player
- Philip Mathews – men's basketball assistant coach (2010–2013)
- Billie Moore – women's basketball head coach (1977–1993), member of the Basketball Hall of Fame
- Kevin O'Connor – men's basketball assistant coach (1979–1984)
- Kathy Olivier – women's basketball head coach (1993–2008), women's basketball head coach (1986–1993)
- Lorenzo Romar – men's basketball assistant coach (1992–1996)
- Jim Saia – men's basketball assistant coach (1996–2003)
- Ivo Simović – men's basketball assistant coach (2022–2023)
- Kenny Washington – first women's basketball head coach (1974), basketball player (1963–1966)
- Greg White – men's basketball assistant coach (1995–1996)
- Sidney Wicks – men's basketball assistant coach (1984–1988), player (1968–1971)
- John Wooden – men's basketball head coach (1948–1975), won 10 NCAA championships, member of the Basketball Hall of Fame as both a player and coach
- Caddy Works – men's basketball head coach (1921–1939)
- Ernie Zeigler – men's basketball assistant coach (2003–2006)

==== Football coaches ====
- Sal Alosi – strength and conditioning coordinator
- Jerry Azzinaro – defensive coordinator (2018–2021)
- Dino Babers – assistant head coach (2004–2007)
- William F. Barnes – head football coach (1958–1964)
- Eric Bieniemy – running backs coach (2003–2005), offensive coordinator (2024)
- Gary Blackney – assistant coach (1978–1979)
- Sam Boghosian – assistant coach (1957–1964), player (1952–1954)
- Tom Bradley – defensive coordinator (2015–2017)
- Bob Chesney – head football coach (2026–present)
- James J. Cline – head football coach (1923–1924)
- George W. Dickerson – interim head football coach (1958)
- Terry Donahue – head football coach (1976–1995), football player (1965–1966), member of the College Football Hall of Fame
- Karl Dorrell – head football coach (2003–2007), football player (1983–1986)
- DeShaun Foster – head football coach (2024–2025), running backs (2017-2023), player (1998-2001)
- Justin Frye – offensive line coach (2018–2021), offensive coordinator (2019–2021)
- Edwin C. Horrell – head football coach (1939–1944), member of the College Football Hall of Fame
- Mike Johnson – interim head coach (2011)
- Chip Kelly – head football coach (2018–2024), former NFL coach
- Ed Kezirian – interim head football coach (2002), football player
- Adrian Klemm – run game coordinator and offensive line coach
- Bert LaBrucherie, 1929 – head football coach (1945–1948), football player (1926–1928)
- D'Anton Lynn – defensive coordinator (2023)
- Demetrice Martin – defensive backs coach
- Noel Mazzone – offensive coordinator (2012–2015)
- Bill McGovern – defensive coordinator (2022–2023)
- Jim L. Mora – head football coach (2012–2017)
- Rick Neuheisel, B.A. 1984 – head football coach (2008–2011), football player (1980–1983)
- Kennedy Polamalu – running backs coach
- Tommy Prothro – head football coach (1965–1970), member of the College Football Hall of Fame
- Pepper Rodgers – head football coach (1971–1973)
- Henry Russell Sanders – head football coach (1949–1957)
- Lou Spanos – defensive coordinator (2012–2013)
- William H. Spaulding – head football coach (1925–1938)
- Bob Toledo – head football coach (1996–2002)
- Harry Trotter – head football coach (1920–1922), track coach (1919–1946)
- Jeff Ulbrich – assistant head coach
- Dick Vermeil – head football coach (1974–1975)
- DeWayne Walker – interim head football coach (2007)
- Eric Yarber – wide receivers coach

==== Miscellaneous coaches ====
- Elvin C. Drake – head sports trainer, 1942–1972; head track and field coach, 1947–1964, winning the NCAA championship in 1956; coached decathletes Rafer Johnson and Yang Chuan-kwang during the 1960 Summer Olympics, in which they won the gold and silver medals; UCLA's Drake Stadium named in his honor
- Adam Krikorian – men's and women's water polo coach, won nine NCAA championships; assistant coach, won one NCAA championship; UCLA water polo player, won 1995 NCAA championship
- Al Scates – men's volleyball coach, won 19 NCAA championships
- John Smith – track and field coach, inventor of the drive phase and world record holder at 440 yards (400 m) event

== Fictional characters ==
- Alex Dorpenberger – fictional professor in animated series Close Enough
- Bridgette Hashima – fictional student in animated series Close Enough

== See also ==
- List of people from Los Angeles
