= Scott A. McGregor =

American technology executive and philanthropist

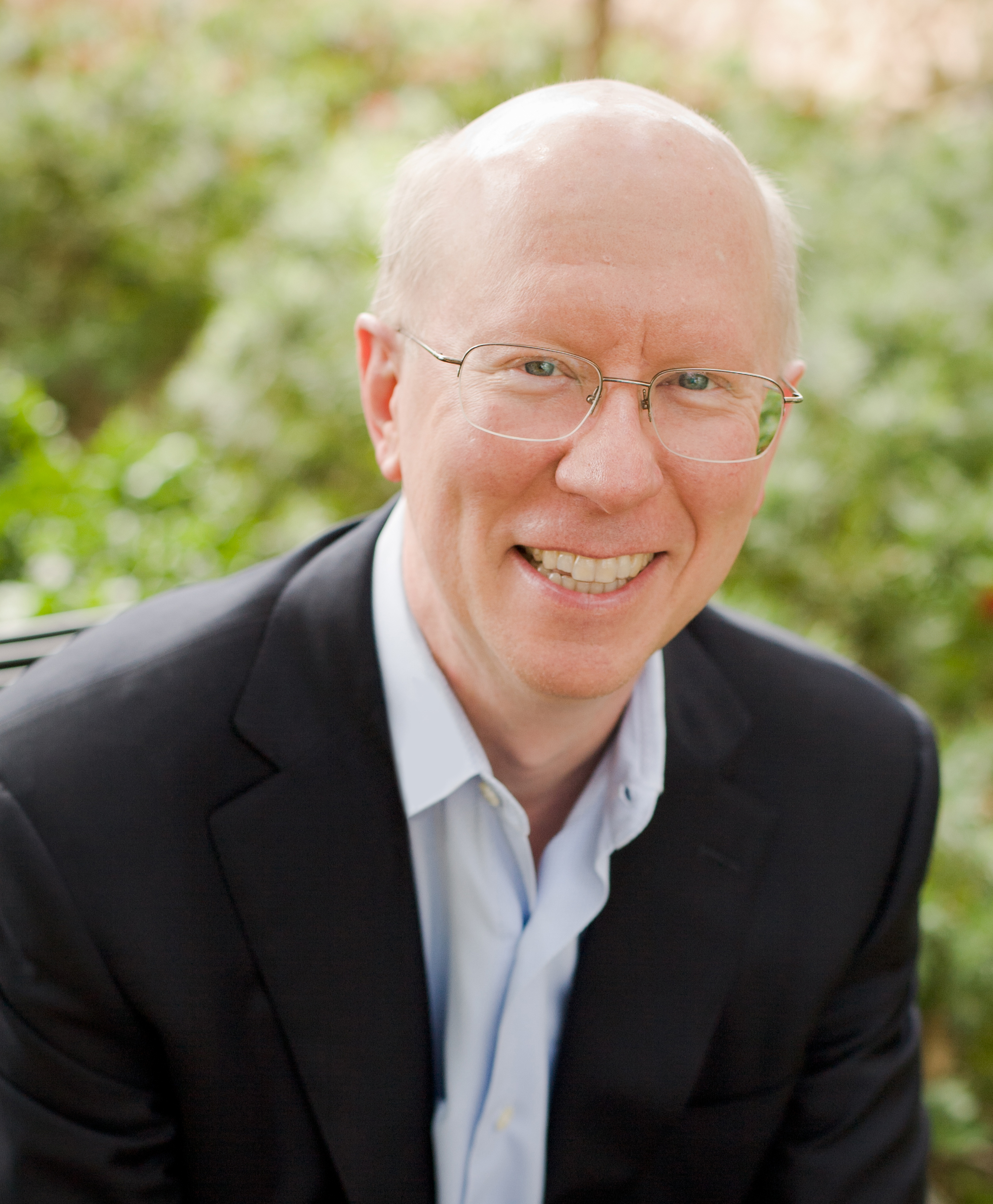
- Scott A. McGregor in 2012
- Born: 1956 (age 69–70)
- Education: Stanford University (BS, MS)
- Occupations: Software developer; technology executive; philanthropist
- Years active: 1978–present
- Known for: Windows 1.0; Broadcom; Broadcom Foundation
- Spouse: Laurie Girand
- Children: 3

Scott A. McGregor (born 1956) is an American technology executive and philanthropist. He was the lead developer of Windows 1.0 (the first release of Microsoft Windows), he was the CEO of Philips Semiconductors from 2001 to 2004, and was the CEO of Broadcom from 2005 until its acquisition in 2016.

== Early life and education ==
McGregor was born in and grew up in St. Louis, Missouri. He moved to Wilmington, Delaware during high school and graduated from Concord High School in 1974, where he was part of the chess team and Chairman of the debate team. While in Delaware, he competed and was named a runner-up in the 1974 Westinghouse Science Talent Search. Beginning in 1974, he attended Stanford University, where he studied computer science with a focus on artificial intelligence. He graduated in 1978 with a bachelor's degree in Psychology and a master's degree in Computer Science and Computer Engineering.

== Career ==
=== 1978–1998: Software industry ===
Starting in his senior year at Stanford, McGregor worked for Xerox Corporation's Palo Alto Research Center (Xerox PARC). There, he joined a small software engineering team that helped create the windowing system for the Xerox Star—the first personal computer with a graphical user interface (instead of the text-based interfaces which preceded them). McGregor worked on the operating systems's windowing system (the "Cedar Viewers Window Systems"), the first system to display multiple programs at once.

In 1983, McGregor was recruited by Bill Gates to join Microsoft, to be the developer team lead for Windows 1.0—the company's first graphical user interface-based operating system. McGregor led the Interactive Systems Group, which began with a staff of three, characteristic of Microsoft's small development teams. In this role, the authors of a 1994 book said "his big-systems orientation" was seen as misaligned with the team's limited x86 PC environment, but described him as a "charismatic ideas guy" and an "articulate academic".

McGregor's first objective was to "figure out what Windows ought to be and deliver it to the world." At the time, Microsoft's proposed product didn't have a complete product specification. But in November 1983 McGregor flew with Gates and Steve Ballmer to New York's Plaza Hotel for a press event, where Windows was announced with support commitments from 23 computer manufacturers. In a later interview, McGregor said Microsoft "basically announced the product when we hadn't even designed it yet."

Gates' initial perspective, in 1983, had been that the development would be just a set of subroutines that individual applications would add to enable windowing; at the time, the product was going to be called "Interface Manager". But McGregor had written the window manager component for PARC's complete, interactive programming environment, and had called his PARC software "Windows". As the project grew in scope, it was McGregor's term that became the name for Microsoft Windows. The team grew as well, expanding to more than 30 members by the time they were fully staffed, making it Microsoft's single largest development group. At Microsoft during this time, Gates and McGregor interviewed every technical candidate.

After leaving Microsoft, McGregor joined Digital Equipment Corporation (DEC, now part of HP) as the Program Architect for DECwindows, where he was the co-author of the X Window System, Version 11 (also known as X11) in 1990 (the most current release as of 2020). He went on to lead DEC's Western Software Laboratory in Palo Alto, including the company's ULTRIX workstation software. In the mid-1990s, McGregor moved to Santa Cruz Operation, where he joined as the Senior Vice President of Products, and later became the company's Senior Vice President and General Manager.

=== 1998–2016: Semiconductors ===
In 1998, McGregor was hired to lead Philips Semiconductors' Emerging Business unit, a newly-formed incubator where "promising technologies and products could be developed". The unit focused on rapidly growing markets such as networking, digital media, and RFID. By 2001, the unit had grown to nearly $1 billion in sales; that September, he was promoted to be President and CEO of Philips Semiconductors (now NXP Semiconductors)—one of Philips' five main divisions at the time, and the world's sixth-largest semiconductor company, with 35,000 employees. The unit had been unprofitable for several years; under McGregor, the unit became profitable. McGregor resigned from the role in late 2004 citing a wish to return to the U.S. for his children's school, after living abroad. Philips CEO Gerard Kleisterlee said of McGregor's departure, "We regret to see him leave. He has led the Semiconductors division through one of the most difficult periods in its history and managed to turn it around successfully into a leaner business with a strong focus on innovation."

In October 2004, it was announced that McGregor would be hired as the next President and CEO of chipmaker Broadcom, one of the biggest producers of the chips used in communications equipment. McGregor took over from an interim CEO as the company sought to refocus after the departure of its co-founder and former CEO Henry Nicholas, and soon a $2.24 billion stock options backdating scandal. In contrast with Nicholas, observers reported in 2006 that employees found McGregor "even-keeled", and said McGregor "prides himself on his organization". A 2011 interview called him both "amiable" and "brutally honest." During McGregor's tenure, Broadcom grew from $2.4 billion to $8.6 billion in revenue and became a Fortune 500 company; it first entered the list in 2009, and climbed to spot #327 in 2013.

In a 2014 interview, McGregor commented on the semiconductor industry's scale: "It has never before been possible to get an order for 100 million of something," he said. "It also means it costs $100 million or more to start a new chip company, which is why you see an industry roll-up and no venture capitalists funding new ones." He retired in 2016 upon completing Broadcom's $37 billion acquisition by Avago—part of a wave of acquisitions in the semiconductor industry, and, at the time, the largest acquisition of a technology company ever.

== Board memberships ==
McGregor has served on the board of a number of public companies, as well as industry and nonprofit organizations. McGregor served on the board of Progress Software from 1998 to 2008. And from 2003 to 2006, McGregor served on the board of TSMC. During his tenure at Broadcom (from 2005 to 2016), McGregor also served on the company's board. From 2010 to 2016, McGregor served on the board of Ingram Micro (acquired in 2016 by China's HNA Group). From 2016 to 2017, McGregor served on the board of directors of Xactly Corporation (acquired in 2017 by Vista Equity Partners). In October 2017, after Equifax failed to defend a data breach of 143 million U.S. consumers' digital information, McGregor was appointed to the board of as an independent director. There, he joined its technology committee, which oversees cybersecurity. In 2018, McGregor was appointed to the board of Applied Materials, and from 2019–2021, McGregor was on the board of Luminar Technologies, a company developing sensors for self-driving cars.

In June 2026, McGregor was appointed Chairman at Diraq, a quantum computing company developing quantum computers based on silicon spin qubits.

== Awards ==
- 2013: McGregor was named by Glassdoor as one of 50 CEOs with the highest employee approval rating.
- 2013: McGregor was named one of the top 100 CEO Leaders in STEM by STEMconnector.
- 2013: McGregor received UCLA's Information Systems Executive Leadership Award.

== Philanthropy ==
McGregor is a philanthropist focused on STEM education. In 2009, McGregor co-founded the Broadcom Foundation, and became the foundation's first president and chairman. The foundation sponsors initiatives such as the Broadcom MASTERS, the most prominent national science and engineering competition for middle school students around the world (the middle school variant of the Regeneron Science Talent Search, also hosted by the Society for Science & the Public). In creating the Broadcom Foundation, McGregor cited his own science fair involvement as a factor that contributed to his success.

Since 2015, the Broadcom MASTERS competition has awarded the Scott A. McGregor Leadership Award to one middle school student elected by their peers for their leadership qualities. The Broadcom Foundation said in 2015 that the award was named for McGregor because he had been a champion of the middle school competition "from its infancy in 2010, when it was just a 'big idea.'" At the award's inaugural awards ceremony, McGregor said to the competition's finalists, "I encourage you to continue your exploration and to never be afraid to challenge yourself with new ideas." After he retired from the Broadcom Foundation in 2016, McGregor joined the Board of Trustees of the Society for Science and the Public, the organization that runs both Broadcom MASTERS and the Regeneron Science Talent Search. McGregor is also one of two dozen members of the Raspberry Pi Foundation, and is a member of the Founding Circle of the B612 Foundation. McGregor has a minor planet named after him for his work supporting STEM education.

Together with his wife, Laurie Girand, McGregor has also supported higher learning in STEM. In 2019, they created Harvey Mudd College's chair in STEM Equity Innovation and Research. In 2023, they created Stanford University's Chair of Social Ethics of Science and Technology (held by Rob Reich as of 2023). And in 2021, Harvey Mudd opened the Scott A. McGregor Computer Science Center, a new, 36,000 square foot (3,300 m^{2}) building to house the college's growing Computer Science department, along with a full-floor makerspace, a machine shop, and other community resources. It won several architecture awards for its design, including the 2023 American Institute of Architects Design Award. The building is named for McGregor, who along with his wife, trustee Laurie Girand, was a major donor for the project.

As of 2020, McGregor served on the board of regents for the Boys and Girls Clubs of Capistrano Valley.

== Personal life ==
As of 2020, McGregor resides with his wife Laurie in Orange County, California. His pastimes include cooking and gardening, although a 2011 interviewer called his interests "extreme varieties of these comfortable-sounding pursuits." He is an avid orchid collector, having grown orchids since the age of 12. He maintains a collection of more than 500 different orchid species (along with related cloud forest and carnivorous plants) in a shade house at his home. He is an occasional speaker for various Southern California orchid societies.

== See also ==
- History of Microsoft Windows
