= Bob Leach =

American journalist and screenwriter

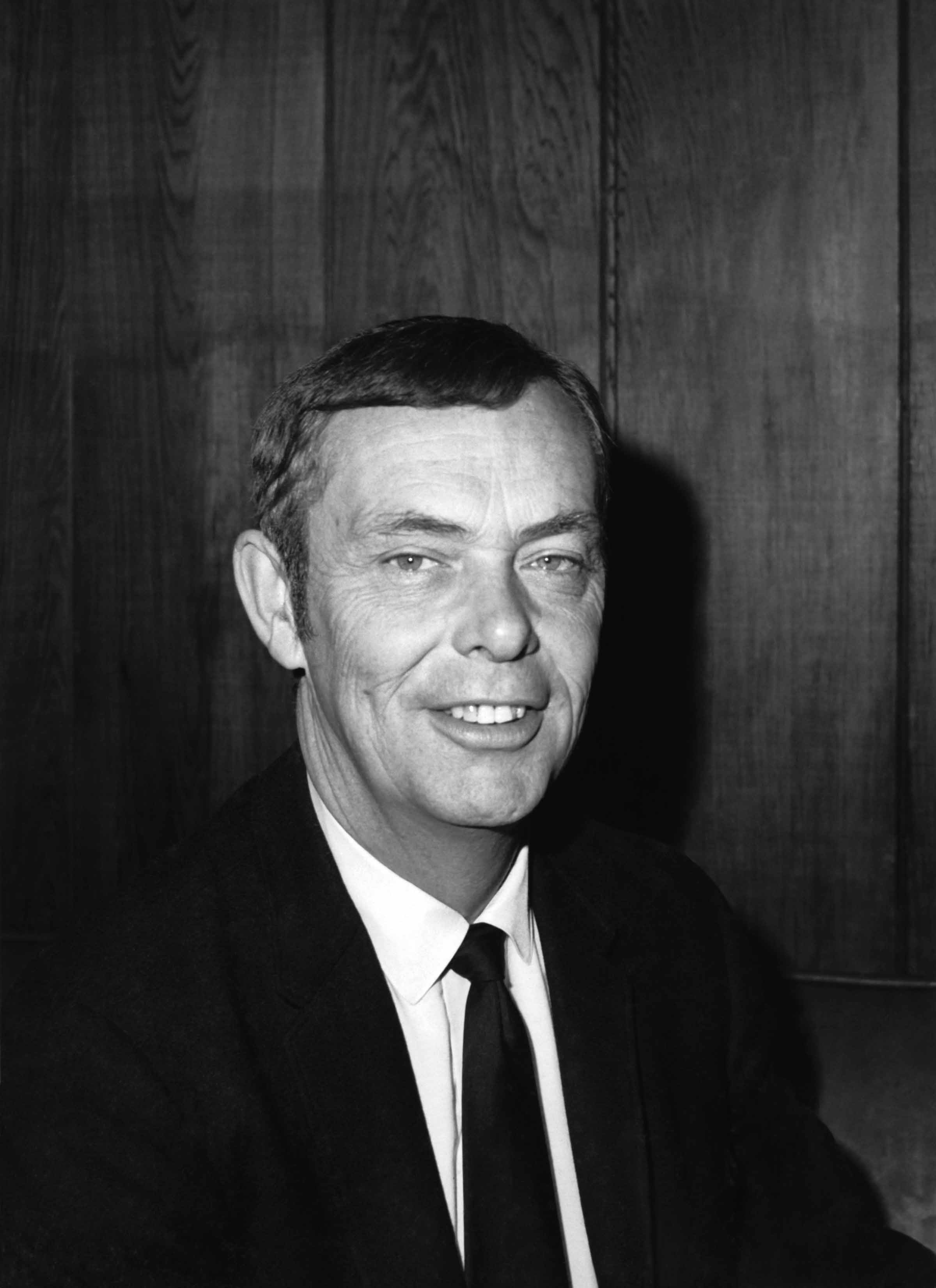
- Bob Leach
- Born: Robert Warnes Leach; December 16, 1914; Dupree, South Dakota, United States
- Died: March 30, 2008 (aged 93)
- Occupations: Journalist; screenwriter; professor; former president Justice for Homicide Victims
- Writing career
- Notable works: The Adventures of Jim Bowie; Perry Mason; The Case of the Dangerous Robin; Ripcord; Everglades; The Littlest Hobo; Men into Space; Tarzan and the Trappers

Robert Warnes Leach (December 16, 1914 – March 30, 2008) was an American journalist and Hollywood screenwriter who became a leading figure in California's victims' rights movement after the death of his stepdaughter, Marsalee (Marsy) Nicholas, in 1983.

He was the husband of victims' rights advocate Marcella Nicholas Leach, and the stepfather of technology entrepreneur and philanthropist Henry Nicholas (who was also the co-founder and former co-chairman, president, and chief executive officer of Broadcom Corp).

Leach was born December 16, 1914, in Dupree, South Dakota to businessman Robert Henry Leach and his wife, the former Edna Warnes.

== Early life and career ==
Leach came to Los Angeles as a teenager to see the 1932 Summer Olympics, and moved to the city shortly thereafter to live with his sister. In 1933, Leach graduated from Los Angeles High School, and in 1938, he earned a bachelor's degree in Journalism and received a 2nd Lieutenant's commission from the ROTC Field Artillery Reserves at the University of Missouri. After completing his higher education, Leach began working for United Press International (UPI), and eventually became UPI's assistant editor in Los Angeles. In 1941, Leach he married his first wife, LaVerne Barrick.

During World War II, Leach served in the U.S. Navy, mainly in the South Pacific, and rose to the rank of lieutenant commander by the time he was released from active duty in 1946. When he returned to Los Angeles, he met a young sailor who asked if he knew any war stories that might make good screenplays. The sailor turned out to be agent Ray Stark, who then helped Leach get a job as junior writer at 20th Century Fox. Leach spent the next 17 years in Hollywood, first as a production assistant at MGM, and later as a TV story editor and screenwriter. At MGM, he worked as an assistant to producer Lawrence Weingarten, where he was involved with multiple films, including: Pat and Mike, Adam's Rib, and Rhapsody. Subsequently, Leach worked for CBS, where he helped develop story ideas into scripts for TV producer Jack Chertok, and wrote freelance teleplays. Leach's TV writing credits include: The Adventures of Jim Bowie, Perry Mason, The Case of the Dangerous Robin, Ripcord, Everglades, and The Littlest Hobo. In 1958, Leach wrote the feature film Tarzan and the Trappers, starring Gordon Scott. In 1959 and 1960, he also worked as a story editor and writer for the series Men into Space.

During the 1960s, Leach changed careers to teaching, and became an instructor in screenwriting and journalism at Cal State Northridge, Santa Monica College and UCLA. In 1967, three years after the end of his first marriage with LaVerne Barrick, Leach married Marcella M. Nicholas, a divorced mother of two small children who was working on a master's degree in journalism at UCLA. The family settled in Malibu, where Marcella Leach maintained a home until her death in 2015.

Leach died on March 30, 2008, at South Coast Medical Center in Laguna Beach, due to complications related to respiratory and kidney ailments. He was 93.

== Victims’ rights ==
On November 30, 1983, Leach's stepdaughter, Marsalee “Marsy” Ann Nicholas, then a 21-year-old senior at UC Santa Barbara, was lured to the residence of and then shot to death by her 28-year- old ex-boyfriend, Kerry Michael Conley, after she ended their turbulent relationship around the time of Thanksgiving. Minutes after Marsy was shot, Leach received a phone call from Kerry Conley's father, Art Conley, who informed Leach of the emergency, and urged him to come to the scene immediately. Leach arrived at the Conley's residence shortly, and witnessed his mortally wounded stepdaughter lying on a bed and surrounded by paramedics, while a bloodied Kerry Conley was being questioned by deputies about the shooting. The deputies did not believe either Conley's description of events leading up to the shooting or his attempted reenactment of what allegedly happened, and he was arrested thereafter.

Unbeknownst to Marsy's grieving family, Conley had posted his $100,000 bond, and had been released only a few days after he was arrested. At the time, neither law enforcement nor any other officials within the judicial system were obligated to notify victims, or their families, of a criminal defendant's pre-trial release. One week after her murder, a funeral was held for Marsy. Following the funeral, Marcella Leach and her son, Henry Nicholas, went to a market to buy groceries. While in the check-out line, Marcella encountered Conley, who was free after posting bail. Leach and his wife were outraged.

Among those who comforted them was Ellen Griffin Dunne, the mother of the murdered actress Dominique Dunne, who had been strangled by an ex-boyfriend. The following year, the Leaches helped Dunne found Justice for Homicide Victims, a non-profit organization dedicated to the support of crime victims and victims' rights.

Bob Leach served for many years as the president of the organization, and both he and Marcella Leach, who remains JHV's executive director, were among the founding board members. His stepson Henry Nicholas also played a crucial role in helping to build JHV.

In 2008, California voters passed Marsy's Law, the nation's most comprehensive victims' bill of rights, named for Marsy Nicholas.

In addition to numerous awards by three governors, the L.A. DA's office, and the L.A. Sheriff's Department, Leach and his wife Marcella have been honored by the national office of Victims of Crime and two presidents. In 2005, the Los Angeles County Assn. of Deputy District Attorneys gave Leach its first Robert Leach Award, which recognizes leadership in victims' rights.
