= Gadzooks =

Gadzooks is a minced oath that may refer to:

- Gadzooks! (TV programme), a British pop music television programme which aired on BBC2 in the 1960s
- Gadzooks (retailer), T-shirt retailer acquired by Forever 21
- Gadzooks, a dragon from the novel series The Last Dragon Chronicles
- Gadzoox, a storage area network company acquired by Broadcom in 2003

== See also ==
- Gaddzooks, a Triple-Element Ethereal Monster from My Singing Monsters
