= Marsy's Law (Illinois) =

Illinois law establishing protections for crime victims

Crime Victims' Bill of Rights
- 2014
- Amendment of Section 8.1 of Article I of the Illinois Constitution

Results
Choice	Votes	%
Yes	2,653,475	78.45%
No	728,991	21.55%
Valid votes	3,382,466	92.24%
Invalid or blank votes	284,742	7.76%
Total votes	3,667,208	100.00%
Yes
80–90%
70–80%
60–70%
50–60%

Marsy's Law for Illinois, formally called the Illinois Crime Victims' Bill of Rights, amended the 1993 Rights of Crime Victims and Witnesses Act by establishing additional protections for crime victims and their families. Voters approved the measure as a constitutional amendment on November 4, 2014. It became law in 2015.

The law is modeled after a piece of 2008 California legislation called Marsy's Law.

== Overview ==
The Illinois Crime Victims' Bill of Rights amended the Constitution of Illinois to include protections for crime victims, including information on hearings, restitution and other protections. It was modeled after 2008 California legislation called Marsy's Law, named after Marsy Nicholas, a California college student who was murdered by an ex-boyfriend in 1983.

Illinois' Marsy's Law was one of several efforts to expand Marsy's Law across the U.S. following its successful adoption in California. Voters in South Dakota and Montana adopted their own versions of Marsy's Law in 2016, but the Montana measure was held unconstitutional by the Montana Supreme Court before it was implemented. There are efforts to introduce similar Marsy's Laws in Hawaii and Nevada. The ballot measure in Illinois received close to $4.3 million in financial support from Henry Nicholas, the brother of Marsy Nicholas and the sponsor of the original campaign in California.

== History ==
In April 2014, Illinois lawmakers in the state's House and Senate agreed to place a referendum on the fall ballot to amend the Illinois state constitution. The proposed amendment to Section 8.1 of Article I of the Illinois Constitution, the Crime Victims' Bill of Rights, appeared on the ballot of the November 4, 2014, general election. Seventy-eight percent of voters who answered the question approved the referendum.

The state House approved HB 1121, the implementation bill reconciling the 1993 Rights of Crime Victims and Witnesses Act with the constitutional amendment, on April 23, 2015. A month later, the state Senate approved the bill. Marsy's Law became effective immediately when Governor Bruce Rauner signed the legislation on August 20, 2015.

The editorial boards of the Chicago Tribune, The Southern Illinoisan, Herald & Review, Rock River Times, The Pantagraph and Rockford Register Star encouraged voters to approve the Marsy's Law amendment. The Chicago Tribune editorial board wrote that the measure gives victims legal standing to assert rights. "Because of the limits in the existing constitutional text," the editorial board wrote, "this change cannot be made by passing a law — only by revising the constitution." The Daily Herald (Arlington Heights), The News-Gazette (Champaign-Urbana) and Quad-City Times editorial boards opposed the amendment. Whereas The News-Gazette and Quad-City Times said the referendum offered no new protections, the Daily Herald said the constitution change "adds little aside from some enforcement provisions to rights already granted" and could increase court costs.

Illinois Attorney General Lisa Madigan supported Marsy's Law by saying victims are "owed a voice". The Illinois Family Institute sided with supporters of the amendment who said it would help enforce existing laws.

Opponents of Marsy's Law included House Majority Leader Barbara Flynn Currie, Illinois State Bar Association and defense attorneys (The Illinois Association of Criminal Defense Attorneys) . Currie said the proposal would slow court proceedings. The bar association argued the changes should be made through statutes, rather than amendments to the state constitution.

== Provisions of the law ==
The Illinois Crime Victims' Bill of Rights amended the 1993 Rights of Crime Victims and Witnesses Act by establishing additional protections for victims of crimes and their families. The law says crime victims have the right to be free from harassment, intimidation and abuse throughout the court process. The law ensures victims receive timely notice of all court proceedings and the accused's conviction, sentence, imprisonment and release. Additionally, the law allows victims the right to communicate with prosecution; to be heard at proceedings on post-arraignment release decisions, pleas, or sentencings; to attend trials and other court proceedings, and to have an advocate attend hearings with them; restitution; and to have their safety and the safety of their family considered in bail decisions and conditions of release.

=== Constitutional changes ===
The amendment changed Section 8.1 of the Illinois Constitution of 1970. Section 8.1 was originally adopted with the 1992 ratification of the Crime Victim Rights Amendment. Section 8.1 was amended to read:

Section 8.1: Crime Victims' Rights:

a) Crime victims, as defined by law, shall have the following rights:

1) The right to be treated with fairness and respect for their dignity and privacy and to be free from harassment, intimidation, and abuse throughout the criminal justice process.
2) The right to notice and to a hearing before a court ruling on a request for access to any of the victim's records, information, or communications which are privileged or confidential by law.
3) The right to timely notification of all court proceedings.
4) The right to communicate with the prosecution.
5) The right to be heard at any post-arraignment court proceeding in which a right of the victim is at issue and any court proceeding involving a post-arraignment release decision, plea, or sentencing.
6) The right to be notified of the conviction, the sentence, the imprisonment, and the release of the accused.
7) The right to timely disposition of the case following the arrest of the accused.
8) The right to be reasonably protected from the accused throughout the criminal justice process.
9) The right to have the safety of the victim and the victim's family considered in denying or fixing the amount of bail, determining whether to release the defendant, and setting conditions of release after arrest and conviction.
10) The right to be present at the trial and all other court proceedings on the same basis as the accused, unless the victim is to testify and the court determines that the victim's testimony would be materially affected if the victim hears other testimony at the trial.
11) The right to have present at all court proceedings, subject to the rules of evidence, an advocate and other support person of the victim's choice.
12) The right to restitution.

b) The victim has standing to assert the rights enumerated in subsection (a) in any court exercising jurisdiction over the case. The court shall promptly rule on a victim's request. The victim does not have party status. The accused does not have standing to assert the rights of a victim. The court shall not appoint an attorney for the victim under this Section. Nothing in this Section shall be construed to alter the powers, duties, and responsibilities of the prosecuting attorney.

c) The General Assembly may provide for an assessment against convicted defendants to pay for crime victims' rights.

d) Nothing in this Section or any law enacted under this Section creates a cause of action in equity or at law for compensation, attorney's fees, or damages against the State, a political subdivision of the State, an officer, employee, or agent of the State or of any political subdivision of the State, or an officer or employee of the court.

e) Nothing in this Section or any law enacted under this Section shall be construed as creating :1) a basis for vacating a conviction or (2) a ground for any relief requested by the defendant

== Results ==
To be approved, the measure required either 60% support among those specifically voting on the amendment or 50% support among all ballots cast in the 2014 Illinois elections. The measure ultimately achieved both.

For the proposed amendment of Section 8.1 of Article I of the Illinois Constitution
Option	Votes	% of votes on measure	% of all ballots cast
Yes	2,653,475	78.4	72.10
No	728,991	21.6	19.81
Total votes	3,382,466	100	91.90
Voter turnout	45.07%		
