= Nihar Jindal =

American electrical engineer

Nihar Jindal is an electrical engineer at Broadcom Corporation in Irvine, California. He was named a Fellow of the Institute of Electrical and Electronics Engineers (IEEE) in 2015 for his contributions to multiuser multi-antenna communications.
