= Marcella Leach =

American victims' rights advocate and activist (1929–2015)

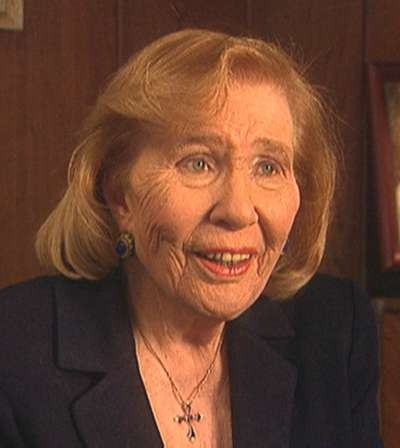
- Born: Marcella Martin; August 23, 1929; Louisville, Kentucky, U.S.
- Died: March 15, 2015 (aged 85); Orange, California, U.S.
- Occupations: Activist, advocate
- Spouse: Bob Leach (m. 1967; died 2008)
- Children: 2
- Website: http://www.justiceforhomicidevictims.net http://www.marsyslawforall.org

Marcella Leach (née Martin; formerly Nicholas; August 23, 1929 – March 15, 2015) was an American victims' rights advocate based in Southern California and the mother of businessman Henry Nicholas. After the murder of her daughter, Marsalee (Marsy) Nicholas in 1983, she helped build Justice for Homicide Victims, one of California's early victims' rights organizations. Her late daughter is the namesake for Marsy's Law, the California Constitutional Amendment and Victims' Bill of Rights, which appeared on the November, 2008, ballot as Proposition 9.

== Victims' rights advocacy ==
On November 30, 1983, Leach's daughter, Marsalee Ann "Marsy" Nicholas, was murdered by her ex-boyfriend, Kerry Michael Conley. Marsy, then 21, was a senior at UC Santa Barbara and had come home to Point Dume for Thanksgiving when Conley, with whom she had broken up, shot her. Conley was convicted of second-degree murder and sentenced to 17 years to life in prison, where he died in 2007. In the nearly two-year interim between the murder and the trial, Conley remained free on bail, and was frequently seen around the neighborhood where Marcella Leach and her husband Bob Leach, still lived.

Ellen Griffin Dunne, the mother of actress Dominique Dunne, who had been strangled to death by a former boyfriend a year earlier, comforted Leach and her family. When Dunne decided in late 1983 to create a local support organization for the survivors of homicide victims, the Leaches were among the founding members, along with Marcella Leach's son Henry Nicholas. The California Center for Family Survivors of Homicide was formed as a nonprofit, with a subgroup, Justice for Homicide Victims, as its public face.

Marcella and her second husband, Bob Leach, a journalist and Hollywood screenwriter, and her family assumed leadership of Justice for Homicide Victims in 1990 after Dunne moved to Arizona; Bob Leach served for many years as the president of Justice for Homicide Victims, and Marcella Leach was its longtime executive director. During the 1990s, the organization campaigned for improved law enforcement and longer penalties for convicted felons, including California's Three Strikes Law. By the late 1990s and early 2000s, Marcella Leach was executive director of the group, which had 10,000 members.

The organization grew and was refocused as an educational non-profit. In 2008, Leach was a signatory of the Marsy's Law ballot initiative, which was led and sponsored by her son Henry Nicholas. The constitutional amendment was enacted by voters in November 2008 and became law.

In addition to awards from three governors, the Los Angeles District Attorney's office and the Los Angeles Sheriff's Department, Marcella and Bob Leach were honored by the National Office of Victims of Crime, and two United States presidents. In 2005, Marcella Leach was awarded the National Crime Victim Service Award from the U.S. Department of Justice.

She died on March 16, 2015, aged 85, of Alzheimer's disease at UC Irvine Medical Center in Orange, California.
