= Stan Boland =

British entrepreneur

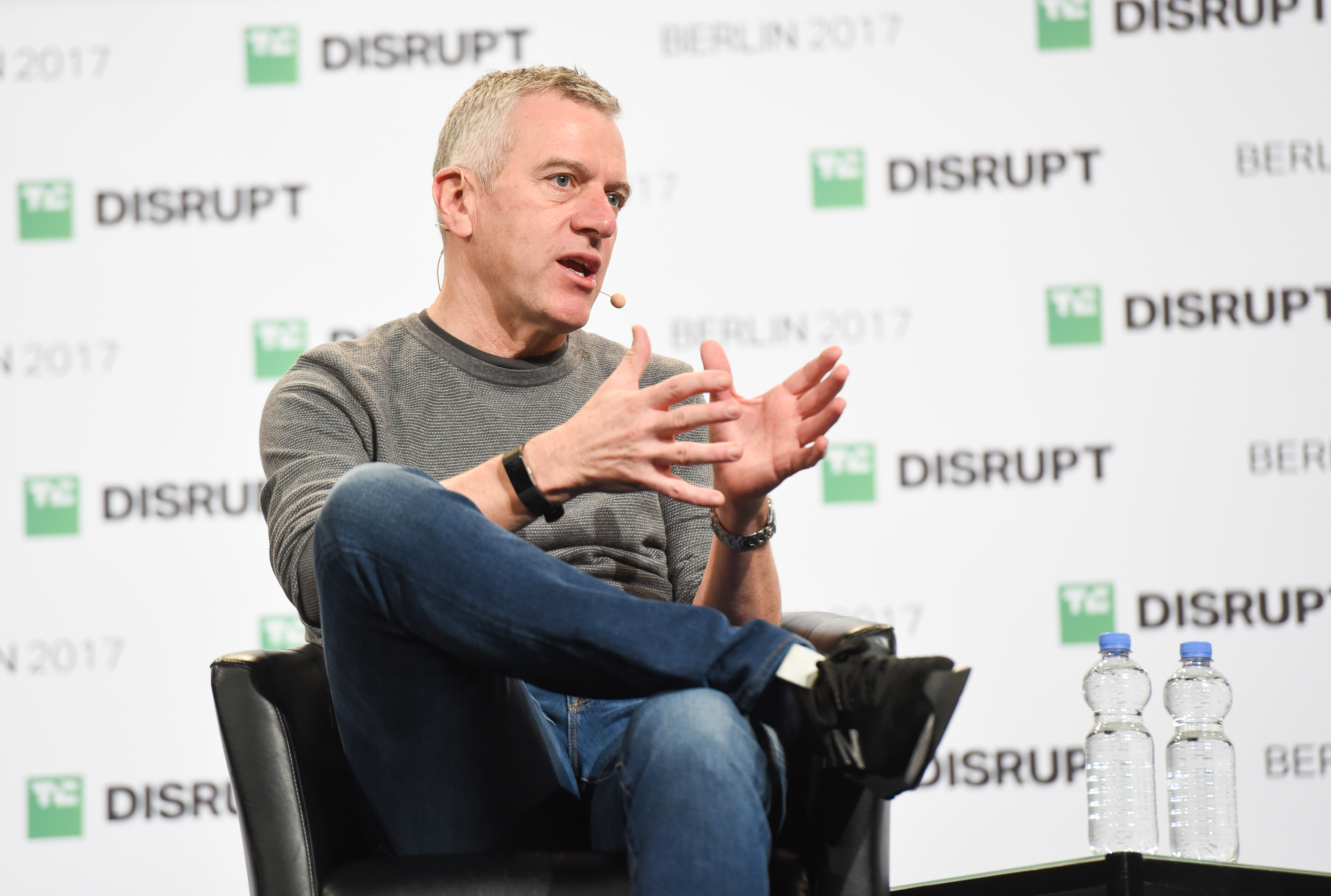
- Stan Boland talks at TechCrunch Disrupt Berlin in 2017
- Born: 1959 or 1960 (age 65–66)
- Education: University of Cambridge
- Employer: FiveAI
- Organization: Global Semiconductor Alliance
- Known for: FiveAI, Icera, Nvidia, Element 14, Acorn Computers

Stan Boland is a British entrepreneur in the information technology sector.

== Biography ==
Boland studied physics at the University of Cambridge. He cited Hermann Hauser, Andy Hopper, and Robin Saxby as influences on his career.

Boland was employed as Foreign Exchange Manager at Rolls-Royce Aerospace, Deputy Treasurer at Bell Group and Asset Treasurer at Bricom. He worked for Robert Holmes à Court in the 1980s. Working at ICL from 1990 to 1997, he became involved in the technology sector, holding positions including Finance Director, Director of Treasury & Tax and Group Treasurer. In 1997, he moved to Acorn Computers, ultimately spun-out as Element 14. Broadcom acquired Element 14 in 2000 for $640M, with Boland becoming Vice President of its DSL business unit. He has been a director of ARM Holdings.

Icera was co-founded by Boland in 2002 and acquired by Nvidia in 2011 for $367M plus an undisclosed staff retention amount.

Boland was reported in April 2013 as being appointed CEO of wireless technology startup Neul. From January 2014, he has also been Chairman of NMI, the UK national association for companies in the electronics systems sector.

Stan is a co-founder and the CEO of FiveAI.

== Sports ==
Boland rowed for Derwent Rowing Club 1982-1987.
