= Illinois Crime Victim Rights Amendment =

On November 3, 1992, Illinois voters approved the Crime Victim Rights Amendment (also known as "Amendment 1"), a legislatively referred constitutional amendment which added Article I, Section 8.1 to the Illinois Constitution of 1970. This amendment guaranteed crime victims certain rights, including the right to receive information about cases in which they are involved.

== Constitutional changes ==
The amendment added Article I, Section 8.1 to the Illinois Constitution of 1970, which read:

Section 8.1: Crime Victim's Rights:

a) Crime victims, as defined by law, shall have the following rights as provided by law:

1) The right to be treated with fairness and respect for their dignity and privacy throughout the criminal justice process.
2) The right to notification of all court proceedings.
3) The right to communicate with the prosecution.
4) The right to make a statement to the court at sentencing.
5) The right to be informed about the conviction, sentence, imprisonment, and release of the accused.
6) The right to timely disposition of the case following the arrest of the accused.
7) The right to be reasonably protected from the accused throughout the criminal justice process.
8) The right to be present at the trial and all other court proceedings on the same basis as the accused, unless the victim is to testify and the court determines that the victim's testimony would be materially affected if the victim hears other testimony at the trial.
9) The right to have present at all court proceedings, subject to the rules of evidence, an advocate or other support person of the victim's choice.
10) The right to restitution.

b) The General Assembly may provide by law for the enforcement of this Section.

c) The General Assembly may provide for an assessment against convicted defendants to pay for crime victims' rights.

d) Nothing in this Section or in any law enacted under this Section shall be construed as creating a basis for vacating a conviction or a ground for appellate relief in any criminal case.

== Election ==
In order to be ratified by Illinois voters, the amendment required either 60% support among those specifically voting on the amendment or 50% support among all ballots cast in the elections.

Crime Victim Rights Amendment
Option	Votes	% of votes on measure	% of all ballots cast
Yes	2,964,592	80.56	57.40
No	715,602	19.45	13.86
Total votes	3,680,194	100	71.26
Voter turnout	55.76%		

Amendment results by county Yes: 80–90%; 70–80%

== Later history ==
The 2012 ratification of Marsy's Law amended the Article I Section 8.1 that the amendment had created.
