= Henry Samueli =

American businessman

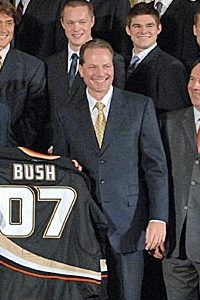
- Samueli (center) in 2008
- Born: September 20, 1954 (age 72); Buffalo, New York, U.S.
- Education: University of California, Los Angeles (BS, MS, PhD)
- Known for: Co-founder of Broadcom Corporation; Owner of the Anaheim Ducks
- Spouse: Susan Samueli
- Children: 3

Henry Samueli (born September 20, 1954) is an American businessman and engineer. He is a co-founder of Broadcom Corporation, owner of the Anaheim Ducks of the National Hockey League (NHL), and a prominent philanthropist in the Orange County, California, community. He is chairman of Broadcom Inc. He is also a professor (on leave of absence) in the Electrical and Computer Engineering Department at UCLA, and a distinguished adjunct professor in the Electrical Engineering and Computer Science Department at UC Irvine.

He holds honorary doctorate degrees from the Technion-Israel Institute of Technology and the National Chiao Tung University in Taiwan.

He is a named inventor in 75 U.S. patents. He is a Fellow of the Institute of Electrical and Electronics Engineers (IEEE) for contributions to VLSI architectures and realizations for high-bit rate digital communication systems. He is also a Fellow of the American Academy of Arts and Sciences (AAAS). He was also elected a member of the National Academy of Engineering (NAE) in 2003 for pioneering contributions to academic research and technology entrepreneurship in the broadband communications system-on-a-chip industry. In 2012, Samueli won the Marconi Prize and Fellowship for "pioneering advances in the development and commercialization of analog and mixed signal circuits for modern communication systems, in particular the cable modem. He is the 80th wealthiest person in the world, with a net worth of 25.3 billion dollars as of December 17, 2024, according to Forbes and the Bloomberg Billionaires Index.

In 2026, he was elected to the American Philosophical Society.

== Biography ==
=== Early life and education ===
Samueli's parents, Sala and Aron, were Polish-Jewish Holocaust survivors. They arrived in the United States with almost nothing. Samueli stocked shelves in his family's Los Angeles liquor store and graduated from Bancroft Junior High School and Fairfax High School. Samueli became interested in electronics while building an AM/FM radio during a shop class at Bancroft.

Samueli attended the University of California, Los Angeles, where he received his bachelor's degree (1975), master's degree (1976), and Ph.D (1980), all in the field of electrical engineering. His Ph.D. advisor was Alan N. Willson Jr. and his Ph.D. dissertation is titled "Nonperiodic forced overflow oscillations in digital filters."

=== Broadcom origins ===
In 1991, while still working as a professor at UCLA, Samueli co-founded Broadcom Corporation with one of his Ph.D. students, Henry Nicholas. Each invested $5,000 and initially worked out of Nicholas' Redondo Beach home. They rented their first office in 1992 in Westwood, Los Angeles, near the UCLA campus and moved to Irvine, CA in 1995 at which time Samueli took a leave of absence from UCLA to be at Broadcom full-time. Broadcom went public three years after that. Samueli still remains on leave from UCLA and he continues to be listed on the Electrical and Computer Engineering Department faculty roster.

=== Anaheim Ducks ownership ===
In 2003, the Samuelis purchased the management contract for the Arrowhead Pond of Anaheim sports and entertainment venue, creating Anaheim Arena Management, LLC, to oversee all operations of the arena, and in 2005 they purchased the Mighty Ducks of Anaheim National Hockey League (NHL) club, the arena's largest tenant, from the Walt Disney Company for $75 million. In 2006, the Samuelis announced the team's name change to the Anaheim Ducks and the arena's name change to Honda Center. In 2007, the Anaheim Ducks became the first California team ever to win the Stanley Cup championship.

As of December 2016, Samueli is on the executive committee of the NHL Board of Governors.

In 2015, the Samuelis acquired ownership of the Ducks' American Hockey League affiliate, the Norfolk Admirals. They subsequently moved the franchise to San Diego as part of the AHL's western expansion that year and the team was re-branded as the fourth incarnation of the San Diego Gulls.

In 2017, Forbes reported the Anaheim Ducks were worth $415 million.

== Philanthropy ==
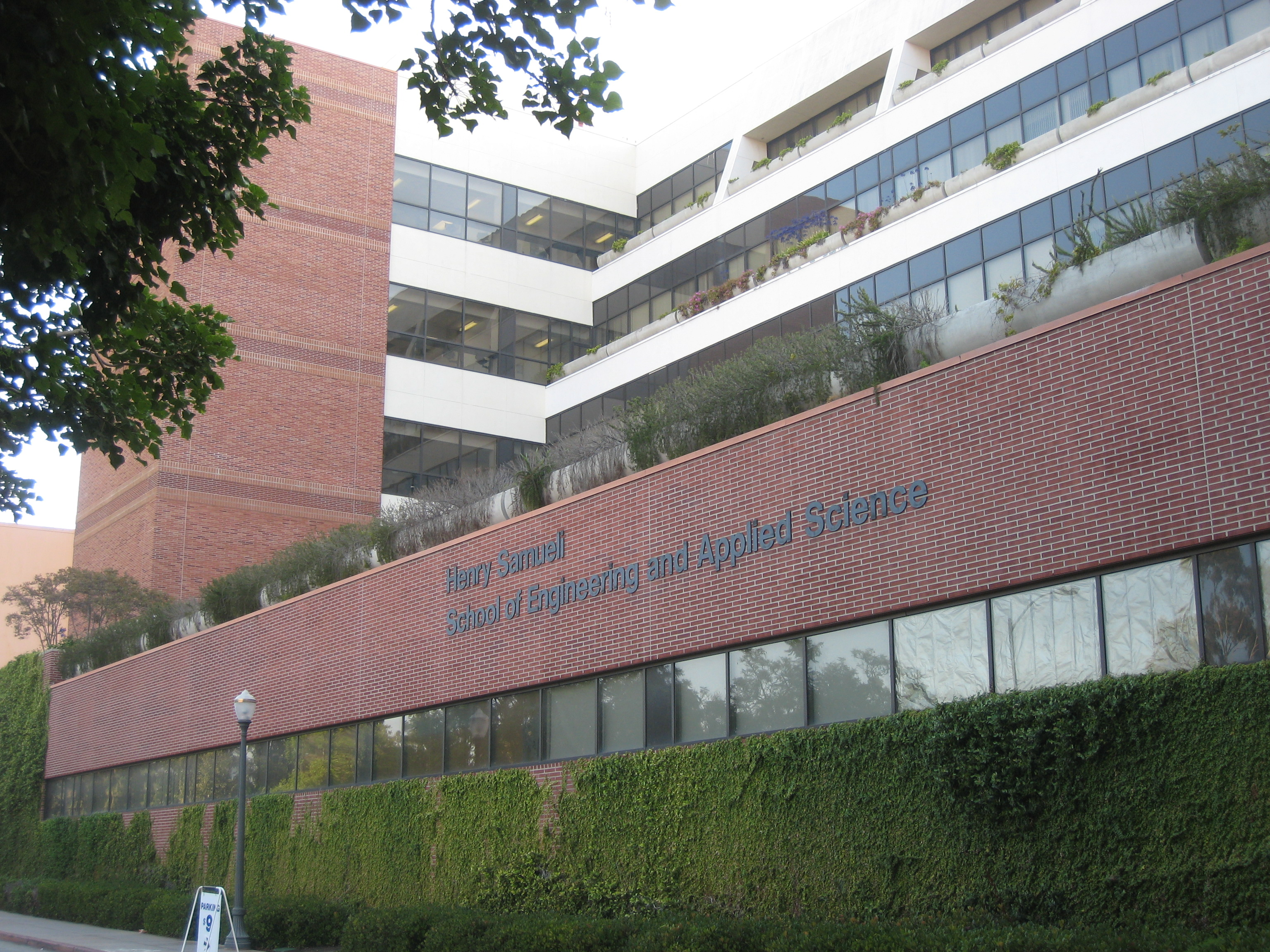
Henry Samueli School of Engineering and Applied Science at UCLA

After Broadcom went public in 1998, the Samueli Foundation was created. The foundation gives to causes in education, health, youth services, and Jewish culture and values. In 2012, the Samuelis joined the Giving Pledge, initiated by Warren Buffett and Bill and Melinda Gates, whose members pledge the majority of their wealth to philanthropy.

In 1999, the Samuelis made major donations to the UCLA School of Engineering and Applied Science and the UC Irvine School of Engineering, both of which have since been named after him.

In 2009, Henry Samueli served as the founding director and chair of the Broadcom Foundation, a 501c(3) corporate nonprofit, that advances STEM Education.

In 2001, the Samuelis established the Susan Samueli Center for Integrative Medicine at UC Irvine. In 2017, the Samuelis made a $200 million gift to UC Irvine to name the health sciences school after them.

In 2015, Samueli received a prize from the Israeli government for his global contribution to innovation and his contribution to innovation in Israel.

Samueli was named a 2017 Fellow by the National Academy of Inventors.

As of 2017, the Samuelis had committed over $500 million to philanthropic causes.

In June 2019, UCLA announced a $100-million gift from the Samuelis, which will be used to expand the engineering school.

== Personal life ==
Samueli resides with his wife Susan in Newport Beach, California. As of 2025, Forbes estimates Samueli's net worth at US$36.3 billion.

== Broadcom stock options investigation ==
During the technology boom in the 2000s, Samueli and Broadcom co-founder Henry T. Nicholas III awarded millions of stock options to attract and reward employees. Prosecutors alleged Samueli and Nicholas granted options to others, including some other top executives, but not themselves, to avoid having to report $2.2 billion in compensation costs to shareholders. In 2006 both the Securities and Exchange Commission and the Department of Justice began investigating Broadcom Corporation for backdating of stock options.

On May 15, 2008, Samueli resigned as chairman of the board and took a leave of absence as Chief Technology Officer after being named in a civil complaint by the SEC.

On June 23, 2008, Samueli pleaded guilty for lying to SEC for $2.2 billion of backdating. Under the plea bargain, Samueli agreed to a sentence of five years probation, a $250,000 criminal fine, and a $12 million payment to the US Treasury.

Prosecutors focused on the fact that Samueli denied under oath any role in making options grants to high-ranking executives. As part of his plea agreement, Samueli admitted the statement was false, and admitted to being part of the options-granting process. However, an internal Broadcom probe laid the majority of blame on CEO Henry Nicholas and CFO William Ruehle.

On September 8, 2008, U.S. District Court Judge Cormac Carney rejected the plea deal that called for Samueli to receive probation, writing: "The court cannot accept a plea agreement that gives the impression that justice is for sale".

Sixteen months later, on December 10, 2009, Judge Carney, after hearing the testimony of all the witnesses at the trial of CFO William Ruehle, dismissed the cases against Samueli, Ruehle, and Nicholas, citing prosecutorial misconduct (and in the case of Samueli, his testimony as well). In his ruling Judge Carney stated,

The uncontroverted evidence at trial established that Dr. Samueli was a brilliant engineer and a man of incredible integrity. There was no evidence at trial to suggest that Dr. Samueli did anything wrong, let alone criminal. Yet, the government embarked on a campaign of intimidation and other misconduct to embarrass him and bring him down.

In the ruling, Judge Carney went on, "Needless to say, the government's treatment of Dr. Samueli was shameful and contrary to American values of decency and justice." The judge ordered Samueli's plea agreement to be expunged from his record, further stating, "Dr. Samueli now has a clean slate."

== Awards and honors ==
- 2003, National Academy of Engineering
- 2004, American Academy of Arts and Sciences
- 2006, Golden Plate Award of the American Academy of Achievement
- 2018, U.S. News STEM Leadership Hall of Fame
- 2018, National Academy of Inventors
- 2020, Ellis Island Medal of Honor
- 2021, IEEE Founders Medal
- 2025, IEEE Medal of Honor

Sporting positions
Preceded by The Walt Disney Company	Anaheim Ducks owner 2004–present	Incumbent
