= Broadcom Corporation =

Defunct American fabless semiconductor company

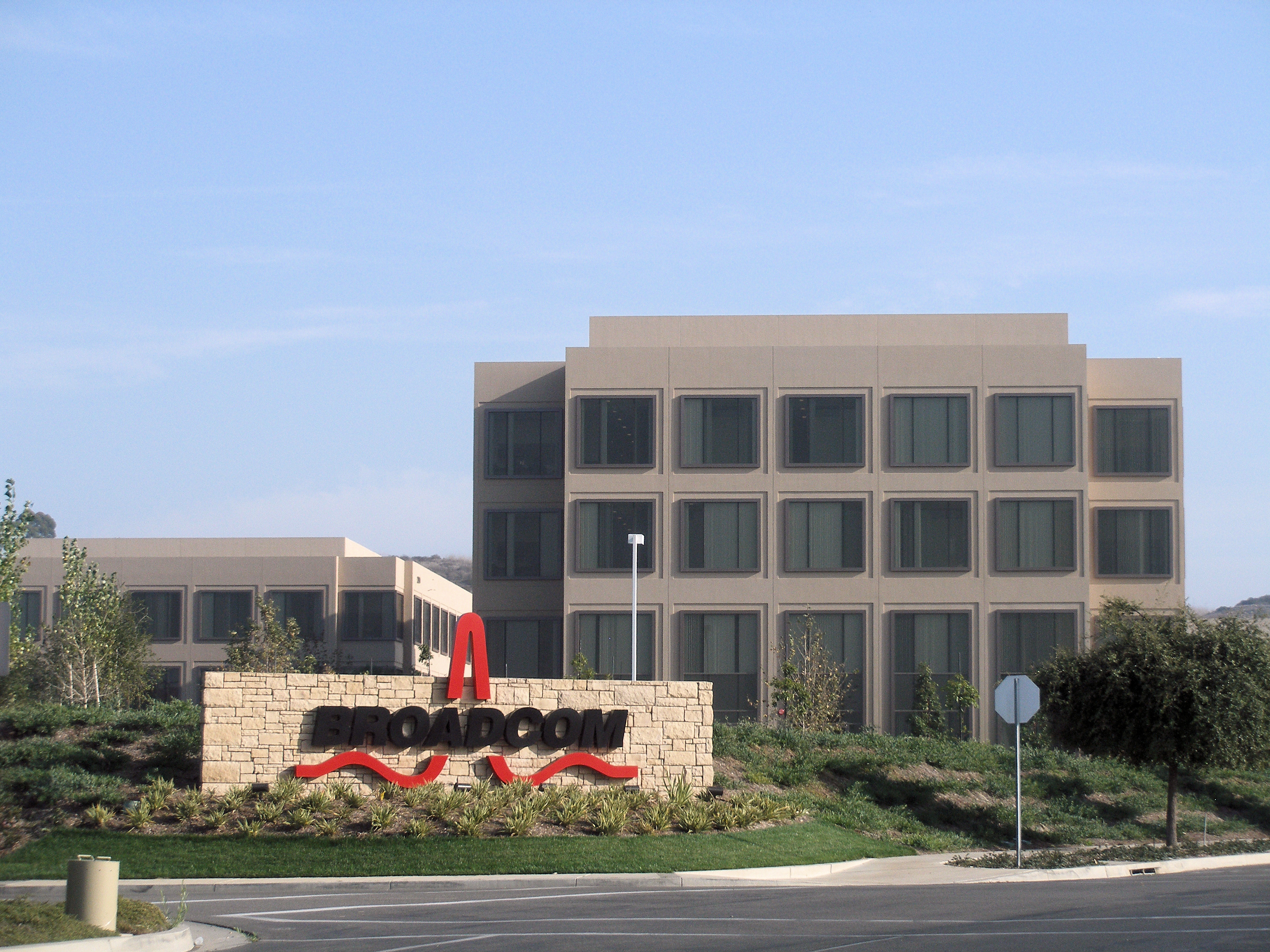
- Headquarters at UC Irvine's University Research Park
- Type: Subsidiary
- Traded as: Nasdaq: BRCM (1998–2016)
- Industry: Semiconductors; Electronics
- Founded: August 1991; 35 years ago
- Founders: Henry Nicholas; Henry Samueli
- Fate: Became a wholly owned subsidiary of Broadcom Limited after being acquired by Avago Technologies
- Successor: Itself (as a wholly owned subsidiary of Broadcom Inc.)
- Headquarters: Irvine, California, United States
- Key people: Scott A. McGregor (CEO; 2005–2016); Henry Samueli (CTO; 1991–2008, 2009–2016)
- Products: Integrated circuits; Cable converter boxes; Gigabit Ethernet; Wireless networks; Cable modems; Network switches; Digital subscriber line; Server farms; Microprocessors; VoIP
- Parent: Broadcom Inc. (2016–present)
- Website: broadcom.com

Broadcom Corporation was an American fabless semiconductor company that made products for the wireless and broadband communication industry. It was acquired by Avago Technologies for $37 billion in 2016 and currently operates as a wholly owned subsidiary of the merged entity Broadcom Inc.

Founded in 1991 by a professor-student pair Henry Samueli and Henry Nicholas from the University of California, Los Angeles, the company moved from its Westwood, Los Angeles, office to Irvine, California, in 1995. Broadcom became a public company three years later with a listing on the Nasdaq. The company was known for its aggressive acquisition strategy, which led to significant growth and market share.

== History ==
=== Founding and growth ===
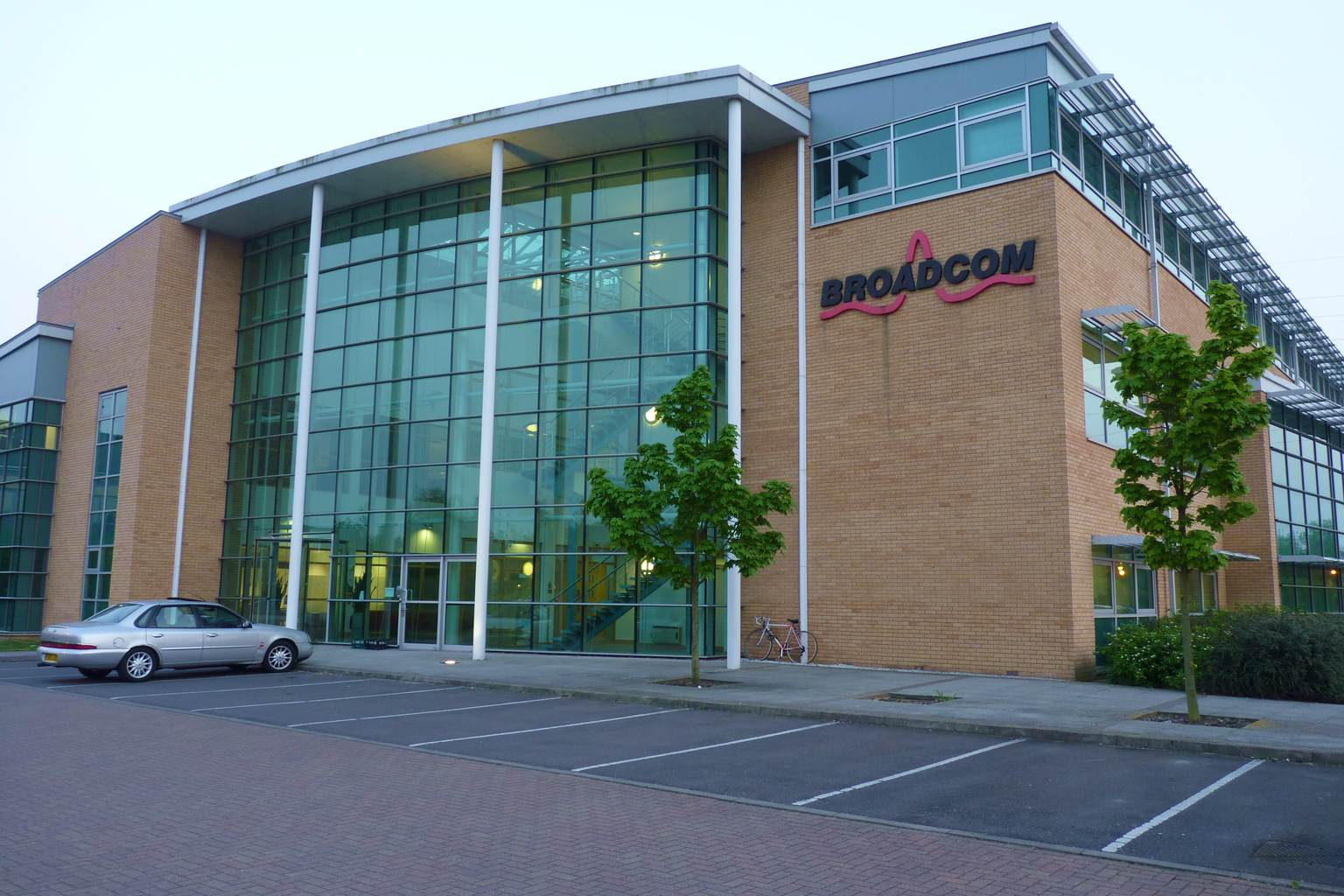
Broadcom facility in Cambridge UK, as seen in 2011

Broadcom Corporation was founded by professor-student pair Henry Samueli and Henry Nicholas from UCLA in 1991. In 1995 the company moved from its Westwood, Los Angeles, office to Irvine, California. In 1998, Broadcom became a public company on the NASDAQ exchange (ticker symbol: BRCM) and employs about 11,750 people worldwide in more than 15 countries.

Broadcom Corporation acquired ServerWorks Corporation, a maker of chipsets for IA-32-based servers, in 2001 for $957 million. This acquisition was one in a string of purchases of companies by Broadcom in the beginning of the 2000s. Unlike the others, which were struggling start-ups, ServerWorks was revenue-generating and profitable.

In 2012, Broadcom's total revenue was $8.01 billion. As of 2011, Broadcom was among Gartner's Top 10 Semiconductor Vendors by revenue. Broadcom first landed on the Fortune 500 in 2009, and climbed to spot #327 in 2013.

=== Battle with Qualcomm ===
In June 2007, the U.S. International Trade Commission blocked the import of new cell phone models based on particular Qualcomm microchips. They had found that these Qualcomm microchips infringed on patents owned by Broadcom. In January 2017, the FTC sued Qualcomm, who allegedly made use of unlawful tactics to maintain "a monopoly on cellular-communications chips."

On April 26, 2009, Broadcom settled its four-year legal battle with Qualcomm over wireless and other patents. The deal also ended the complaints of anti-competitive behavior. As part of the settlement, Qualcomm paid $891 million in cash to Broadcom over a four-year period ending June 2013.

=== Stock options backdating scandal ===
In March 2006, a report by the Center for Financial Research and Analysis identified Broadcom as one of 17 companies "at risk" for having back-dated stock options grants between 1997 and 2002. On May 18, 2006, amid media reports about options practices, Broadcom said it had started an internal review of its stock options grants. On June 12, 2006, Broadcom announced it had received a "request for information" from the U.S. Securities and Exchange Commission (SEC), and that it might soon be the subject of an informal inquiry.

On July 14, 2006, Broadcom estimated it would have to subtract $750 million from earnings due to stock options irregularities. On September 8, 2006, the company announced the amount was at least $1.5 billion, "and could be substantially more." On December 18, 2006, the SEC opened a formal investigation of Broadcom's options practices. On January 24, 2007, Broadcom announced a restatement of its financial results from 1998 to 2005 to include a total of $2.24 billion-worth of expenses related to stock option-based compensation. The grants remained the subject of the formal inquiry by the SEC, and an informal inquiry by federal prosecutors.

In between March and May 2008, the SEC announced charges against Broadcom for fraudulently backdating stock options for nearly five years, from June 1998 to May 2003. In its complaint, the SEC alleged that Broadcom's top officers at the time had misrepresented the dates on which stock options were granted to executives and employees. In describing the scheme, the SEC said: "Through backdating, Broadcom made it appear that the options were granted at times corresponding to low points of the closing price of Broadcom's stock — despite the fact that the purported grant date bore no relation to when the grant was actually approved. This resulted in artificially and fraudulently low exercise prices for those options."

On May 15, 2008, Broadcom co-founder and CTO Henry Samueli resigned as chairman of the board, and took a leave of absence as Chief Technology Officer. On June 5, 2008, Broadcom co-founder and former CEO Henry Nicholas and former CFO William Ruehle were indicted on charges of illegal stock-option backdating. Nicholas was also indicted for violations of federal narcotics laws. However, in December 2009, federal judge Cormac J. Carney threw out the options backdating charges against Nicholas and Ruehle because of prosecutorial misconduct, after finding that federal prosecutors improperly tried to prevent three defense witnesses from testifying.

In 2008, the U.S. Securities and Exchange Commission (SEC) charged executives of Broadcom with fraudulently backdating stock options. Through the scheme, company executives allegedly avoided reporting $2.22 billion in compensation expenses. The company also allegedly overstated its income by between 15% and 422%, and understated its loss by between 16% and 38%, according to the SEC. A judge dismissed the charges against company executives Henry Nicholas and Henry Samueli, citing witness intimidation on the part of prosecutors. The judge also dismissed charges against chief financial officer William Ruehle. In the end, the company had to pay $160M to settle with the SEC.

=== Acquired ===
On May 28, 2015, chip maker Avago Technologies Ltd. agreed to buy Broadcom Corp. for $37 billion in cash and stock. At closing, which completed on February 1, 2016, Broadcom shareholders held 32% of the new Singapore-based company to be called Broadcom Limited. Hock Tan, Avago President and CEO, was named CEO of the new combined company. Dr. Samueli became Chief Technology Officer and member of the combined company's board, and Dr. Nicholas serves in a strategic advisory role within the new company.

The new merged entity was initially named Broadcom Limited but inherits the ticker symbol AVGO. The BRCM ticker symbol was retired.

== Products ==
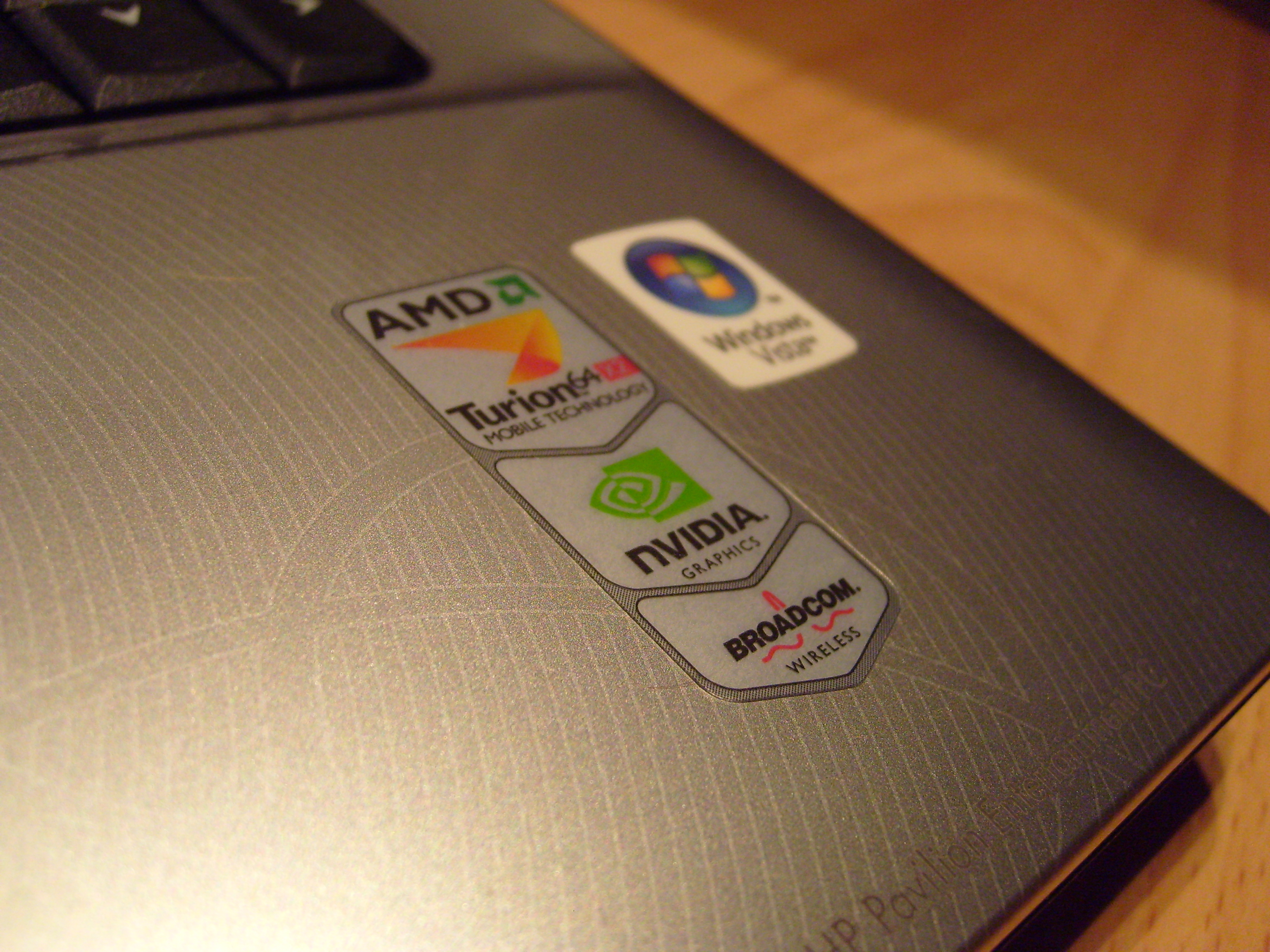
Broadcom wireless badge as seen on an HP laptop in 2007

Broadcom's product line spans computer and telecommunication networking products. Examples of such are products for enterprise/metropolitan high-speed networks, as well as products for small office/home office (SOHO) networks. Additionally, the company produces transceiver and processor ICs for Ethernet and wireless LANs, cable modems, digital subscriber lines, servers, home networking devices (router, switches, port-concentrators) and cellular phones (GSM/GPRS/EDGE/W-CDMA/LTE). It is also known for its series of high-speed encryption co-processors, which serve to offload processor-intensive tasks to a dedicated chip.

The company also has a history of producing ICs for carrier access equipment, audio/video processors for digital set-top boxes and digital video recorders, Bluetooth and Wi-Fi transceivers, and RF receivers/tuners for satellite TV. On September 19, 2011, Broadcom shut down its digital TV operations, along with its Blu-ray chip business.

On June 2, 2014, Broadcom announced its intentions to exit the cellular baseband business.

=== Trident+ ASIC ===
Some vendors offer switching equipment based on Broadcom hardware and firmware (e.g. Dell PowerConnect classics) while other well-known vendors use Broadcom hardware with their own firmware. The Broadcom Trident+ ASIC has been used in many high-speed 10Gb+ switches from vendors such as Cisco Nexus switches running NX-OS, Dell Force10 (now Dell Networking) running FTOS/DNOS, all Arista 7050-series switches, the IBM/BNT 8264, and the Juniper QFX3500.

As of April 2014, the latest member of the Trident family is the Trident II XGS, which can support up to 32 x 40G ports or 104 x 10G ports, as well as a mix of both, on a single chip. Examples of switches using the Trident II XGS chip are the Dell Networking S6000, Cisco Nexus 9000, and some smaller vendors like the EdgeCore AS6700, Penguin Arctica 3200XL, and QuantaMesh T5032.

=== Graphics processing unit ===
VideoCore is the GPU found on some systems-on-a-chips by Broadcom, the most widely known one being the BCM2835, containing a VideoCore IV found in the Raspberry Pi.

=== Video acceleration ===
The Broadcom Crystal HD is capable of video acceleration.

=== WiFi chipsets ===
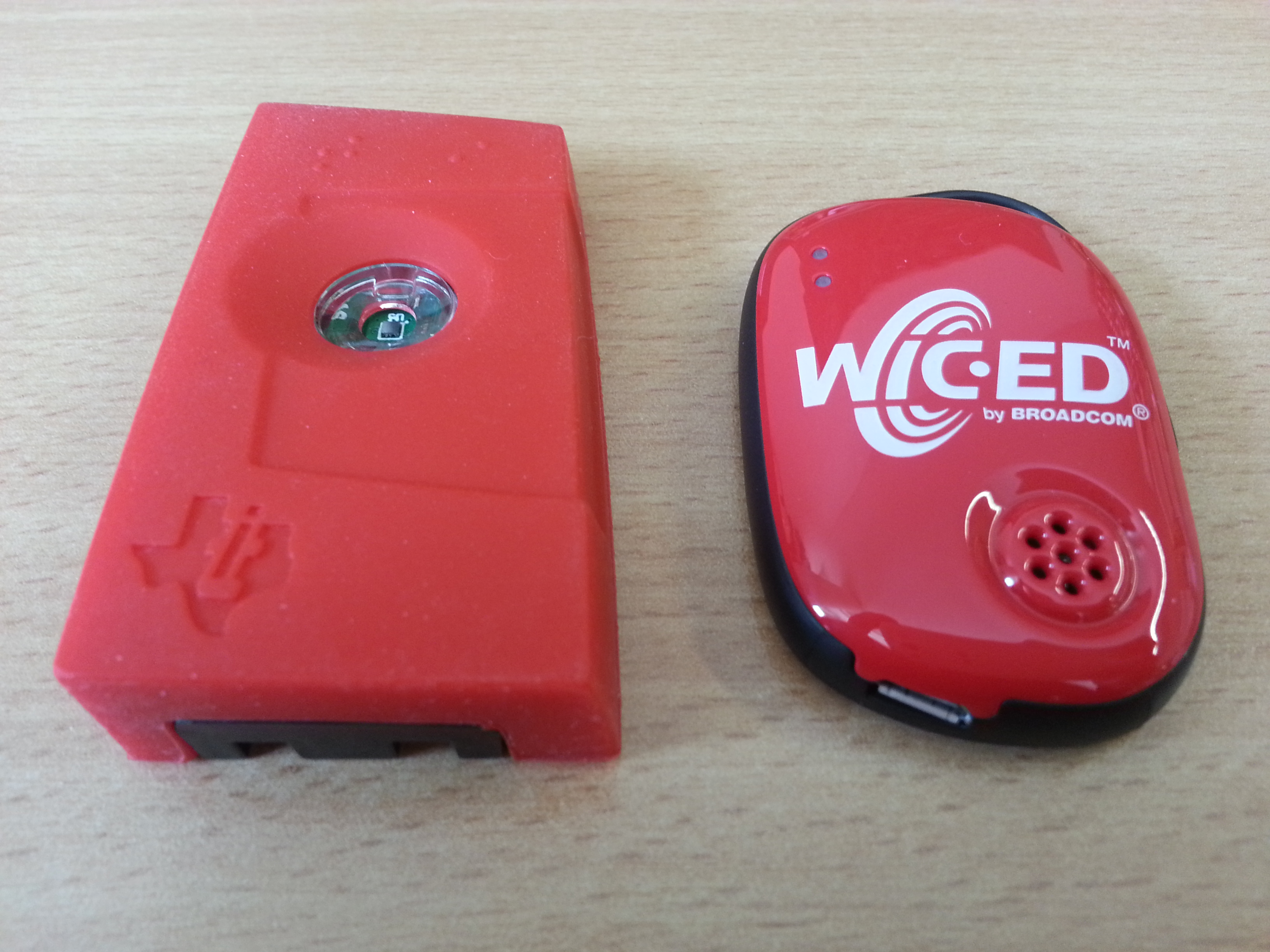
WICED Sense, a device providing multiple physical sensors and Bluetooth connectivity

The Broadcom "BCM43" series of chips implements WiFi support for many Android and iPhone devices. Models include the BCM4339 used in phones such as the Nexus 5 (2013) and the BCM4361 used in the Samsung Galaxy S8 (2017). These are system-on-a-chip devices with a Cortex R4 for processing the MAC and MLME layers and a proprietary Broadcom processor for the 802.11 physical layer. The chips are also capable of handling Wi-Fi Direct, Bluetooth, and NFC signals.

- Broadcom supplies the WiFi+Bluetooth combo chip for the iPhone 3GS and later generations, as well as their corresponding iPod Touch generations.
- In 2005, Broadcom Corporation announced it would be providing Nintendo its “online solution on a chip”, as deployed in laptops and PDAs, enabling 802.11b connectivity with the DS and 802.11g connectivity for the Wii. More specifically, Broadcom would provide Bluetooth connectivity for Wii's controller.
- In 2013, Broadcom unveiled the first 802.11ac 5G Wifi SoCs, which is adopted across many mobile phones, including the Samsung Galaxy S4 and S5, the HTC One series, and the LG Nexus 5. Additionally, routers from Motorola, Netgear, Huawei, and Belkin also include Broadcom's 802.11ac chips.

=== BroadVoice ===
Broadcom authored its own VoIP codecs in 2002, and released them as open source with the LGPL license in 2009. Such codecs are:

- The BroadVoice 16 with a declared bitrate of 16 kbit/s and an audio sampling frequency of 8 kHz
- The BroadVoice 32 with a declared bitrate of 32 kbit/s and an sampling rate of 16 kHz (note, however, that X-Lite SIP phone's menu declares the bitrate as 80,000 bit/s)

=== Linux products ===
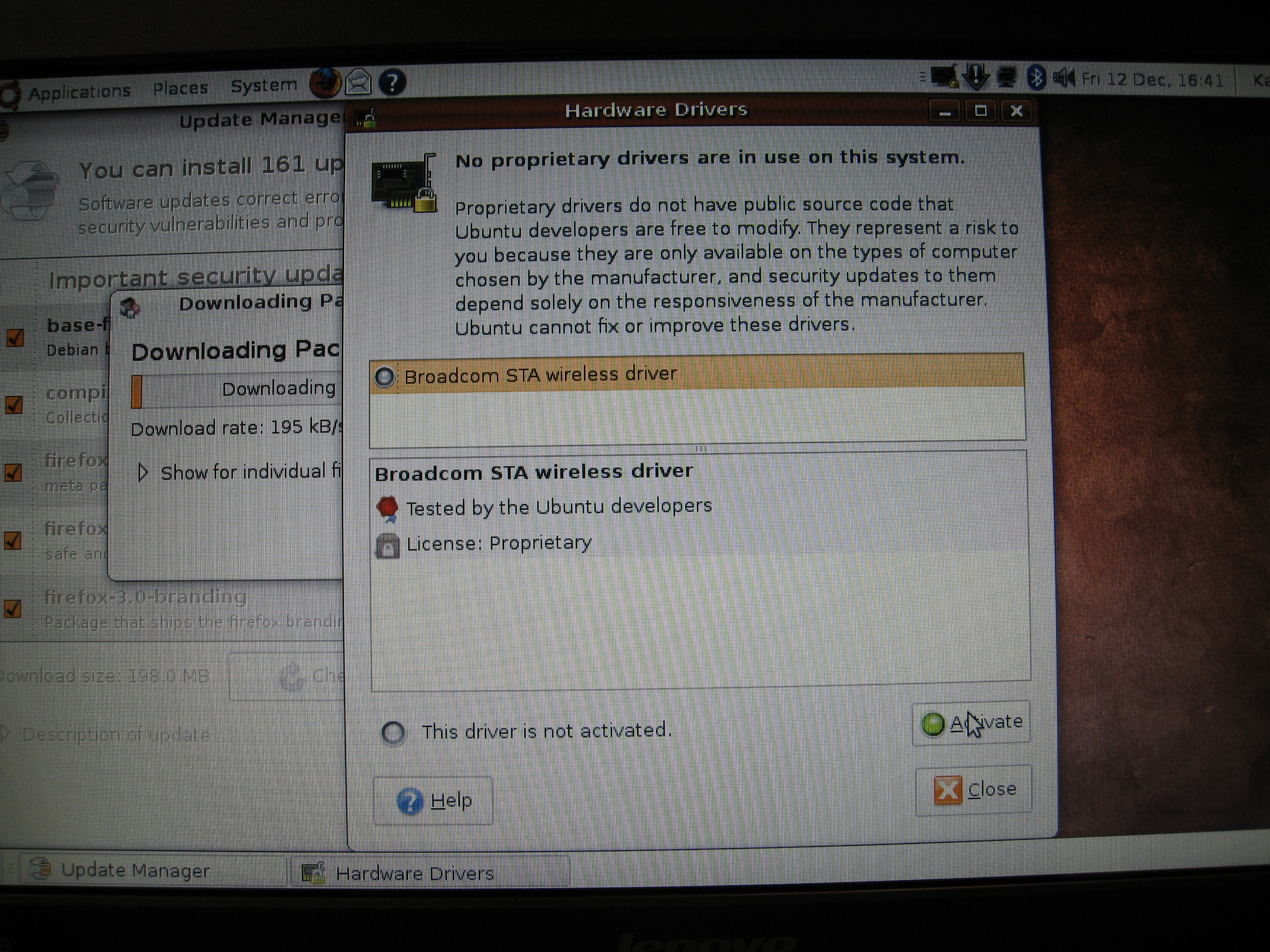
Broadcom STA wireless driver being installed on Ubuntu Linux, 2008

Some free and open source drivers are available and included in the Linux kernel source tree for the 802.11b/g/a/n family of wireless chips that Broadcom produces. Since the release of the 2.6.26 kernel, some Broadcom chips have kernel support, but require external firmware to be built.

In 2003, the Free Software Foundation accused Broadcom of not complying with the GNU General Public License, as Broadcom distributed GPL code in a driver for its 802.11g router chipset without making its source code public. The chipset was later adopted by Linksys, which was later purchased by Cisco. Cisco eventually published the source code for its WRT54G wireless broadband router under the GPL license.

In 2012, the Linux Foundation listed Broadcom as one of the top 10 companies contributing to the development of the Linux Kernel for 2011, placing it in the top 5 percent of an estimated 226 contributing companies. The foundation's Linux Kernel Development report also noted that, during the course of the year, Broadcom submitted 2,916 changes to the kernel. That October, Broadcom released parts of the Raspberry Pi userland under a BSD-style license. According to the Raspberry Pi Foundation, this made it "the first ARM-based multimedia SoC with fully functional, vendor-provided (as opposed to partial, reverse-engineered) fully open-source drivers", although due to substantial binary firmware code, which must be executing in parallel with the operating system, and which executes independently and prior to loading of the operating system, this claim has not been universally accepted.

Broadcom provided a Linux driver for their Broadcom Crystal HD, in addition to hiring Emma Anholt – a former Intel employee – to work on a free and open-source graphics device driver for their VideoCore IV.

=== Raspberry Pi ===
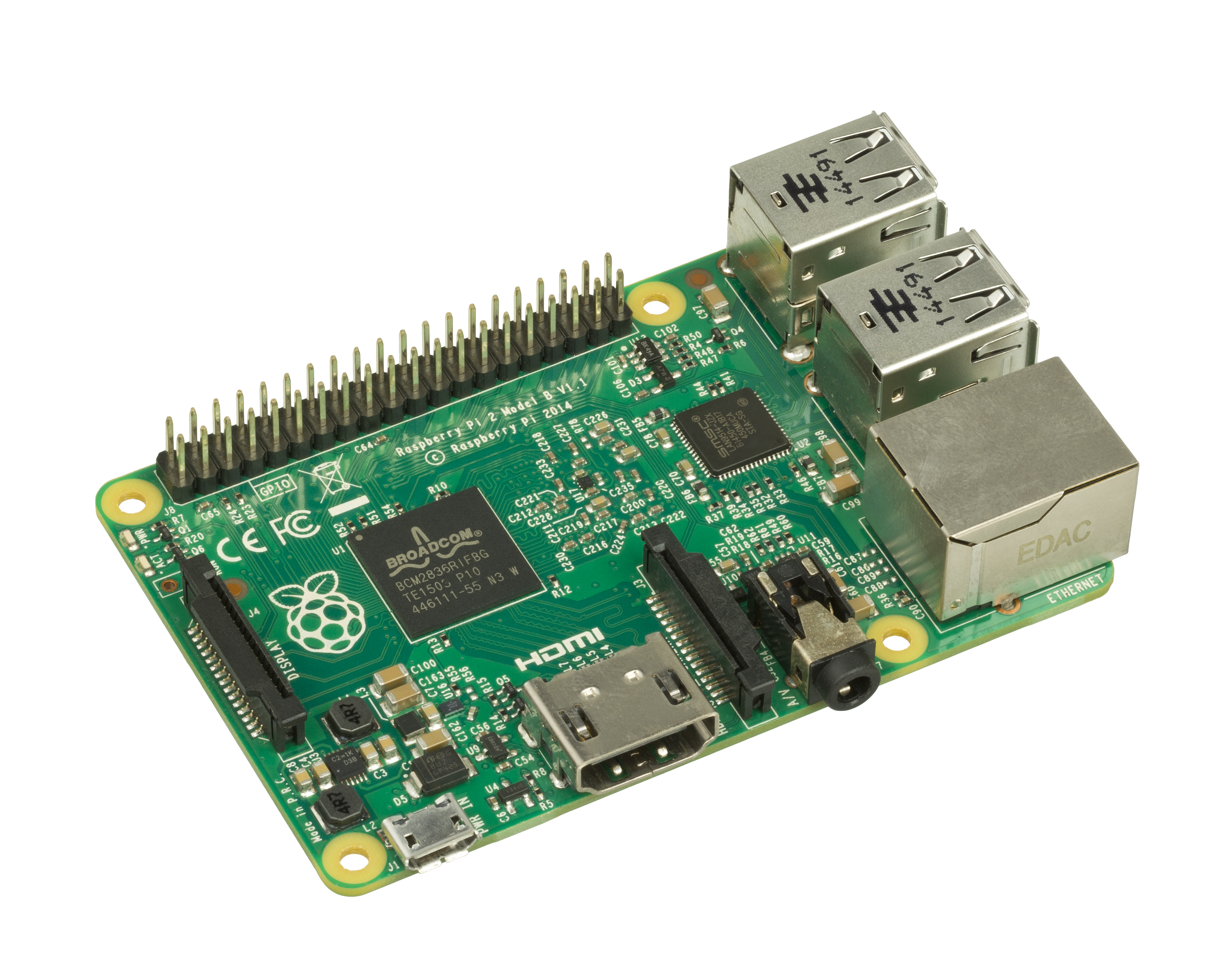
Broadcom produces the system on a chip for the line of popular Raspberry Pi single-board computers.

The charitable Raspberry Pi Foundation requested help from Broadcom for design and manufacture of the Raspberry Pi card, a DRM-free motherboard capable of interaction with external hardware. Broadcom Corporation organized the fabrication of the processor chip for the Raspberry Pi, with the last before the company's acquisition in 2016 being the BCM2837 chip and the WiFi processor BCM43438, which was used by the Foundation.

== Business ==
=== Notable employees ===
- Henry Samueli, co-founder and CTO
- Henry T. Nicholas III, co-founder and CEO until 2003
- Scott A. McGregor, President and CEO from 2005 to the company's acquisition in 2016
- Gottfried Ungerboeck, inventor of trellis coded modulation
- Sophie Wilson, designer of the ARM CPU instruction set
- Eben Upton, creator of the Raspberry Pi single-board computer
- Broadcom Fellows, Broadcom Fellow is the highest honor bestowed upon Broadcom engineers.

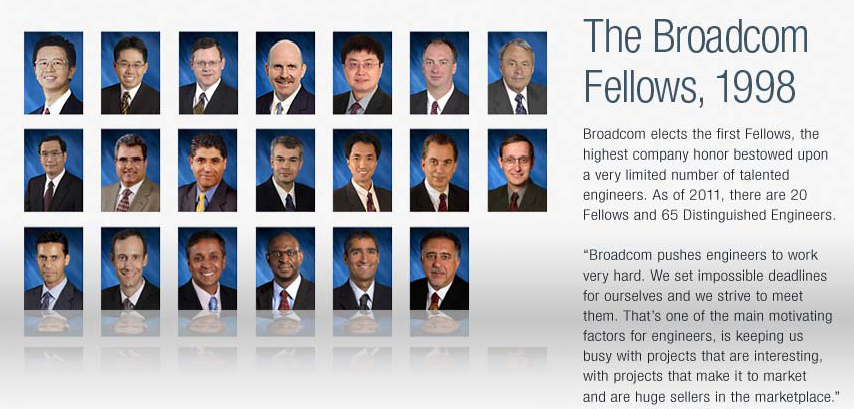
Broadcom Fellows from 1998 to 2011

=== Notable alumni ===
Many Broadcom employees have gone on to take key positions in successful tech enterprises and starts ups, including:

- Bagher Afshar, who became principal RFIC engineer at SpaceX
- Michael Hurlstone, who became CEO at Synaptics
- Nariman Yousefi, who became Senior VP at Inphi Corporation
- Michael de Nil and Andrew Terry who founded Morse Micro

=== Manufacturing ===
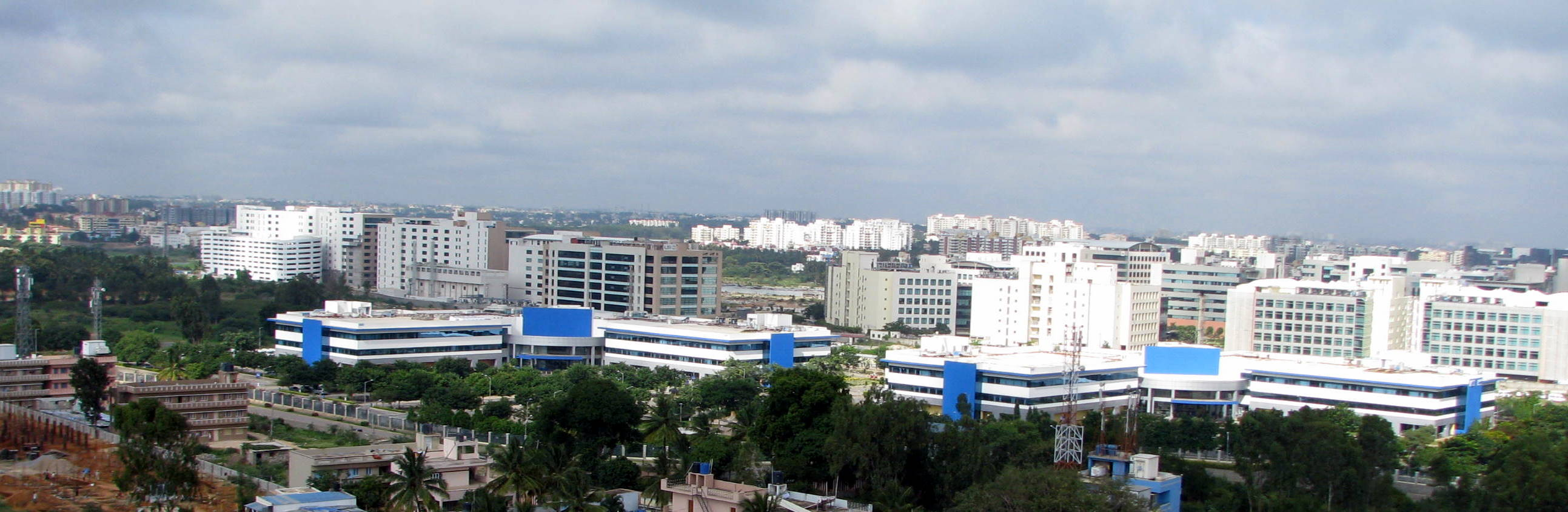
Broadcom facility (center right) in Bangalore, India, as seen in 2010

Broadcom is known as a fabless company. It outsources all semiconductor manufacturing to foundries, such as GlobalFoundries, Semiconductor Manufacturing International Corporation, Silterra, TSMC and United Microelectronics Corporation.

The company planned a custom-built headquarters campus just south of the Orange County Great Park in Irvine, California. It originally intended to occupy the entire campus, but after the Avago acquisition, it sold the site to FivePoint Holdings and then leased back only two of the four buildings. Broadcom was previously headquartered in the University Research Park on the University of California, Irvine campus from 2007 on, and before that was headquartered near the Irvine Spectrum. The company has many other research and development sites including Silicon Fen, Cambridge (UK), Bangalore and Hyderabad in India, Richmond (near Vancouver) and Markham (near Toronto) in Canada and Sophia Antipolis in France.

=== Acquisitions ===
Broadcom was known for its aggressive acquisition strategy that helped it achieve significant growth and market share, and with quickly entering new markets.

In September 2011, Broadcom bought NetLogic Microsystems for a deal of $3.7 billion in cash, excluding around $450 million of NetLogic employee shareholdings, which will transfer to Broadcom.

Date	Acquired company	Amount	Expertise
January 1999	Maverick Networks	$104M in Stock	Multi-layer switches for corporate networks
April 1999	Epigram	$316M in stock	Home networking using telephone wiring, WiFi
June 1999	Armedia Inc.	$67.2M in stock	Digital Video Decoders
August 1999	HotHaus Technologies	$280M in stock	DSP software for VOIP
August 1999	Altocom	$170M in stock	Software modem software
January 2000	BlueSteel Networks	$123M in stock	Security processors
March 2000	Digital Furnace Corp.	$136M in stock	Data compression software
March 2000	Stellar Semiconductor	$162M in stock	3D graphics processors
June 2000	Pivotal Technologies	$242M in stock	Digital video chips
July 2000	Innovent Systems	$440M in stock	Bluetooth radios
August 2000	Puyallup Integrated Circuit Company		IC design and IC macro blocks
July 2000	Altima Communications	$533M in stock	Networking chips
October 2000	Newport Communications	$1,320M in stock	10Gbit Ethernet transceivers
October 2000	Silicon Spice	$1,250M in stock	DSP chips for VOIP
November 2000	Element 14	$641M in stock	DSL chipsets
November 2000	SiByte, Inc.	$2,060M in stock	Fabless producer of 64-bit MIPS networking processor
December 2000	Allayer Communications	$276M in stock	Enterprise and optical networking chips
January 2001	VisionTech, Ltd.	$677M in stock	MPEG-2 compression/decompression of PVRs
January 2001	ServerWorks Corp.	$1,003M in stock	I/O controllers for servers and workstations
July 2001	PortaTec Corporation		Mobile devices
July 2001	Kimalink		Wireless and mobile ICs
May 2002	Mobilink Telecom, Inc.	$190M in stock	Baseband processors for cellphones
March 2003	Gadzoox	$5.8M in cash	Storage-area networks
January 2004	RAIDCore, Inc.	$16.5M in cash	RAID software
April 2004	M-Stream Inc.	$8.6M in cash and 27,000 shares of stock	Technology to improve wireless reception
April 2004	Sand Video, Inc.	$77.5M in stock and $7.4M in cash	Video compression technology
April 2004	WIDCOMM, Inc.	$49M in cash	Software for Bluetooth systems
April 2004	Zyray Wireless, Inc.	$98M in stock	Baseband processors for WCDMA
September 2004	Alphamosaic, Ltd.	$123M in stock	Video processors for mobile devices
February 2005	Alliant Networks, Inc.		Cellular gateway products
March 2005	Zeevo, Inc.	$29.4M in cash and $2.6M in stock	Bluetooth headset products
July 2005	Siliquent Technologies, Inc.	$76M in cash	10Gbit Ethernet interface controllers
October 2005	Athena Semiconductors, Inc.	$21.6M in cash	Digital TV tuners and Wifi technology
January 2006	Sandburst Corporation	$75M in cash and $5M in stock	SOC chips for Ethernet packet switching
November 2006	LVL7 Systems, Inc.	$62M in cash	Networking software
May 2007	Octalica, Inc.	$31M in cash	Multimedia Over Coax technology
June 2007	Global Locate, Inc.	$146M in cash	GPS chips and software
March 2008	Sunext Design, Inc.	$48M in cash	Optical disk drive technologies
August 2008	AMD (DTV Processor Division)	$141.5M in cash	Xilleon DTV processor chips, software and TV tuners
December 2009	Dune Networks	$178M in cash	High speed network switches
February 2010	Teknovus	$123M in cash	Ethernet Passive Optical Network (EPON) chipsets and software
June 2010	Innovision Research & Technology plc	$47.5M in cash	Near field communication expertise and IP
October 2010	Beceem Communications	$316M in cash	4G LTE/WiMax expertise
November 2010	Gigle Networks	$75M in cash	Multimedia home networking
April 2011	Provigent Ltd.	$313M in cash	Microwave Backhaul
May 2011	SC Square Ltd.	$41.9M in cash	Israel-based security software developer
September 2011	NetLogic Microsystems	$3,700M	Next-generation Internet networks
March 2012	BroadLight	$195M in cash	Israel-based fiber access PON developer
June 2012	Wisair	$1M in cash	Short-range Wireless data transmission
January 2013	BroadLogic		Video encoders/decoders, QAM modulation and wideband receivers.
September 2013	Renesas Mobile Corporation	$164M in cash	Mobile chipset platforms (LTE-related assets)

=== Branding ===
The Broadcom logo was designed by Eliot Hochberg, based on the logo for the company's previous name, Broadband Telecom. The Broadband Telecom logo was designed by co-founder Henry Nicholas' then wife, Stacey Nicholas, who was inspired by the mathematical sinc function.

== Philanthropy ==
In 2009, the company founded the Broadcom Foundation as a non-profit corporation with a $50M investment, at the direction of Henry Samueli, the company's co-founder, and then-Broadcom Chief Executive Scott A. McGregor, who cited a history of science fair involvement as a factor for his own success. McGregor was named the foundation's first president and chairman.

== See also ==
- Broadcom Inc.
