= Element 14 Ltd. =

British developer of telecoms equipment

- Type: Private
- Industry: Digital subscriber line
- Predecessor: Acorn Computers
- Founded: 20 April 1999; 27 years ago
- Defunct: 24 October 2000
- Fate: Acquired
- Successor: Broadcom
- Key people: Stan Boland

Element 14 Ltd. was a British developer of digital subscriber line (DSL) equipment created in July 1999 from the disposal of the assets of Acorn Computers. As "a three-site startup", it combined teams from Acorn, Inmos/STMicroelectronics and Alcatel.

== History ==
By January 1999, Acorn Computers Ltd. had renamed to Element 14 Limited to reflect the changed focus of the business and to distance itself from the education market that Acorn Computers was most known for. Other names had been considered by the company, but the domain name e-14.com had been registered before the official announcement.

During this time the ARM Holdings share value had increased to a point where the capital value of Acorn Group was worth less than the value of its 24% holding in ARM. This situation led shareholders to press Acorn to sell its stake in ARM Holdings to provide a return on their investment.

In May 1999, a deal was offered to Acorn Group plc shareholders by MSDW Investment Holdings Limited, a newly incorporated subsidiary of Morgan Stanley Dean Witter Group, in which the MSDW subsidiary would acquire Acorn by giving Acorn shareholders two ARM Holdings shares in exchange for every five Acorn Group shares being held.

As part of the disposal of Acorn's assets, an independent company "owned by Stan Boland and certain senior management" were granted the option to purchase Acorn's silicon and software design activity for £1 million subject to obtaining external financing. This company was effectively the independent Element 14 entity, which set about raising venture capital and subsequently secured £8.25 million in first-round funding from Bessemer Venture Partners, Atlas Ventures and Herman Hauser's Amadeus Capital Partners.

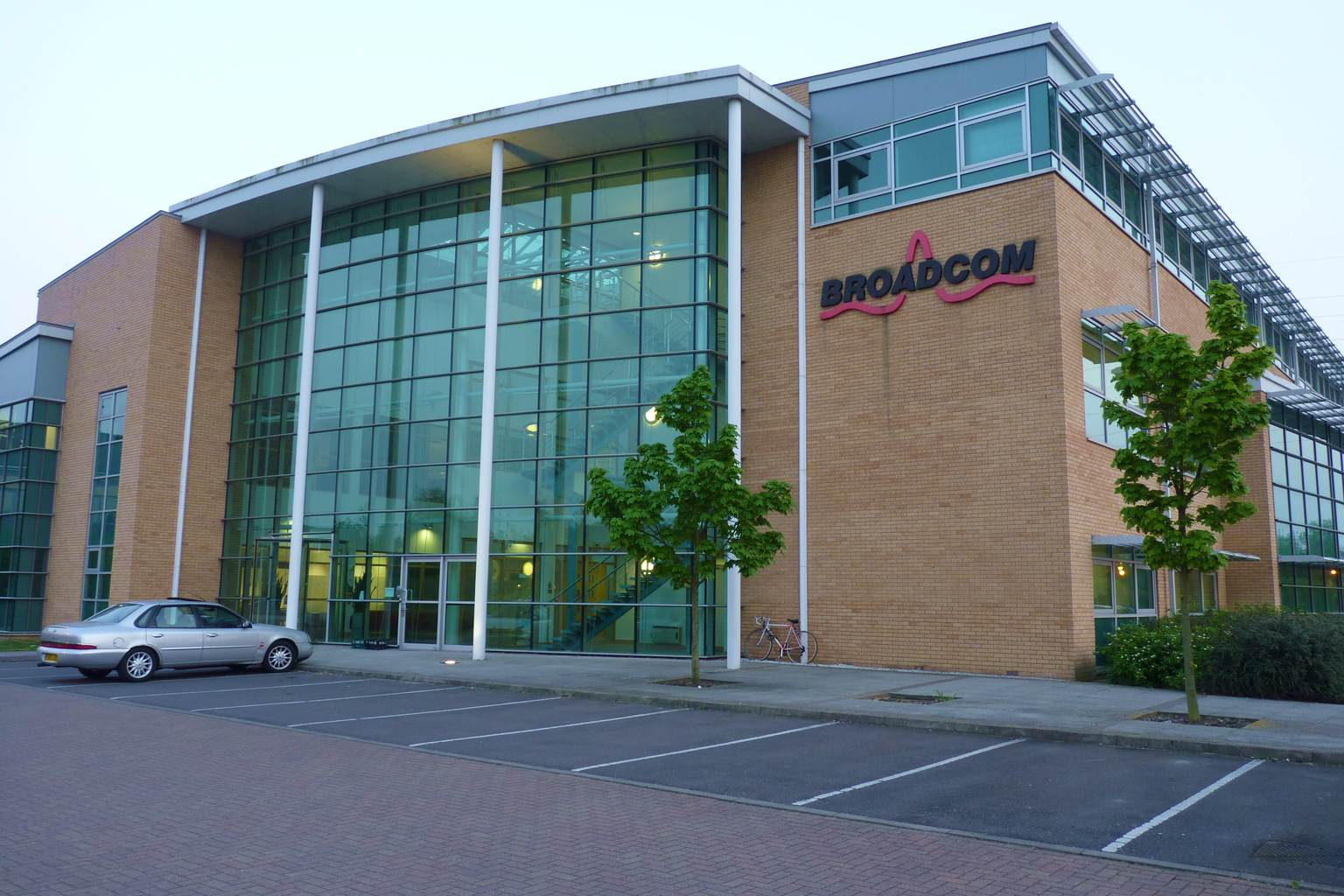
Broadcom Corporation's offices at Cambridge Science Park in 2011

In February 2000, Element 14 successfully head-hunted Alcatel's top digital subscriber line (DSL) engineers, including designers of analogue front-end and digital ICs, xDSL modem software and specialists in asymmetric DSL (ADSL) and very high rate DSL (VDSL) systems, and thereby acquired an engineering centre in Mechelen, Belgium. This reflected a shift towards the companies targeting of the DSP technology away from Media and towards DSL markets.

Element 14 developed IPTV over standard phone lines and worked with telcos such as Canada's NBTel. It continued to develop its DSP products until it was purchased by Broadcom Corporation in November 2000 for £366 million and Element 14 became Broadcom's DSL business unit.
