= Marsy's Law =

California law regarding victim legal rights and parole boards

Marsy's Law (Proposition 9) California Victims' Bill of Rights
- November 4, 2008
- Requires notification to victim and opportunity for input during phases of criminal justice process, including bail, pleas, sentencing and parole. Establishes victim safety as consideration for bail or parole. Fiscal Impact: Potential loss of state savings on prison operations and increased county jail costs amounting to hundreds of millions of dollars annually. Potential net savings in the low tens of millions of dollars annually on parole procedures.
- Results by county (blue indicates support)
- Outcome: Passed
- Website: Marsy's Law; California Office of the Attorney General

Results
Choice	Votes	%
Yes	6,682,465	53.84%
No	5,728,968	46.16%
Valid votes	12,411,433	90.31%
Invalid or blank votes	1,331,744	9.69%
Total votes	13,743,177	100.00%
Registered voters/turnout	17,304,091	79.4%

Marsy's Law, the California Victims' Bill of Rights Act of 2008, enacted by voters as Proposition 9 through the initiative process in the November 2008 general election, is an amendment to the state's constitution and certain penal code sections. The act protects and expands the legal rights of victims of crime to include 17 rights in the judicial process, including the right to legal standing, protection from the defendant, notification of all court proceedings, and restitution, as well as granting parole boards greater powers to deny inmates parole. Critics allege that the law unconstitutionally restricts defendant's rights by allowing prosecutors to withhold exculpatory evidence under certain circumstances, and harms victims by restricting their rights to discovery, depositions, and interviews.

Passage of this law in California led to the passage of similar laws in Florida, Georgia, Illinois, Kentucky, Nevada, North Carolina, Oklahoma, Ohio, Wisconsin, and Tennessee, and efforts to pass similar laws in Hawaii, Iowa, Montana, Idaho, South Dakota, and Pennsylvania. In November 2017, Montana's similar law was found to be unconstitutional and void in its entirety by the Supreme Court of Montana for violating that state's procedure for amending the Montana Constitution. The Pennsylvania Supreme Court reached the same conclusion as Montana under its own state constitution in 2021.

== Background ==
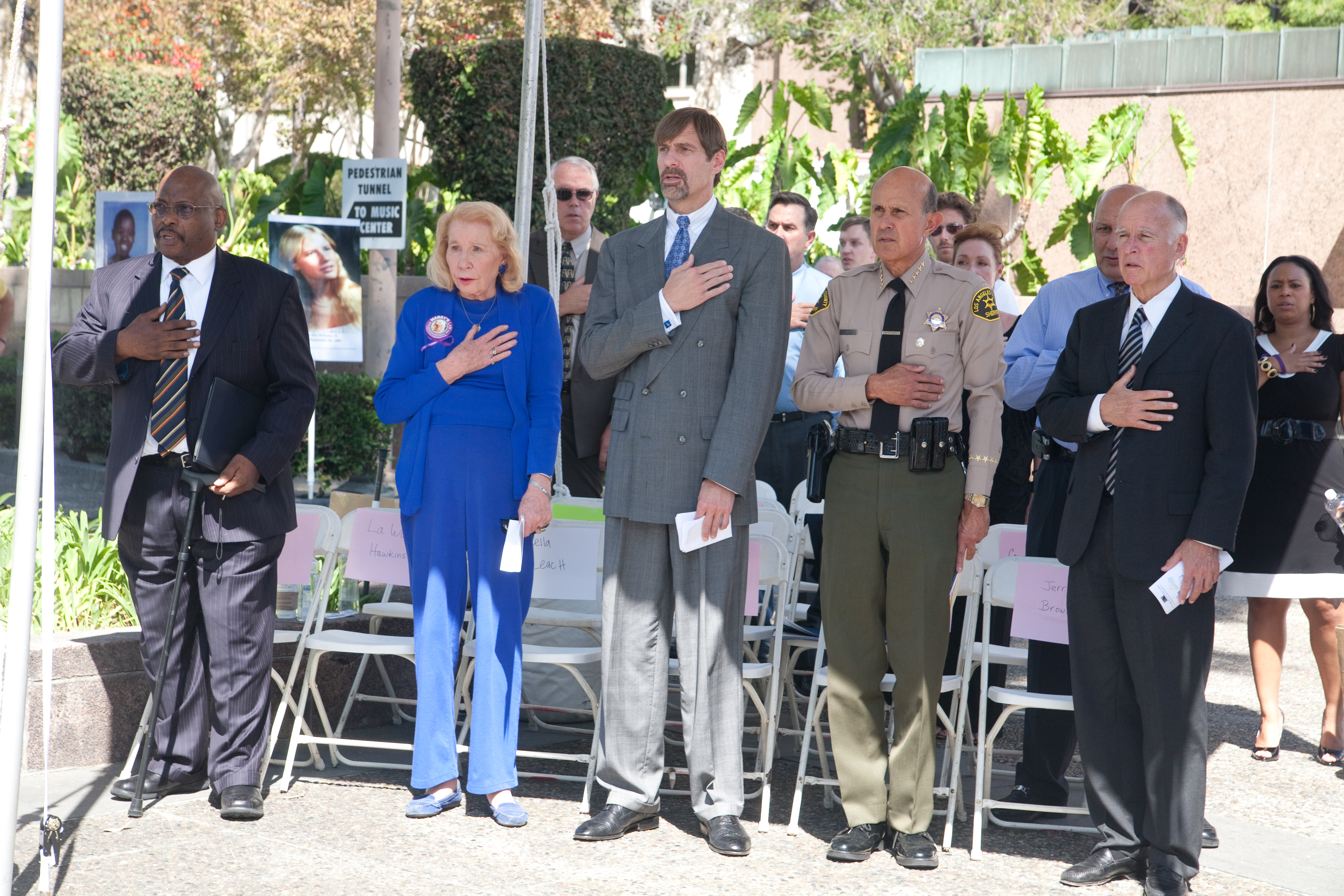
Henry T. Nicholas and his mother, Marcella Leach, join John Gillis, former National Director, U.S. Department of Justice Office for Victims of Crime, Los Angeles County Sheriff Lee Baca and then-California Attorney General Jerry Brown at the annual National Day of Remembrance event in downtown Los Angeles.

Marsy Nicholas was the sister of Henry Nicholas, the co-founder and former co-chairman of the board, president and chief executive officer of Broadcom Corporation. In 1983, Marsy, then a senior at UC Santa Barbara, was stalked and murdered by her ex-boyfriend. Her murderer, Kerry Michael Conley, was tried by a Los Angeles jury and sentenced to life in prison with the possibility of parole in 17 years. Although Conley died in prison from a heart infection complicated by diabetes, one year before Marsy's Law passed in November 2008, the Nicholas family attended numerous parole hearings, which bothered them for years.

The Nicholas family was the main organizer of the campaign to pass Marsy's Law, whom former California Governor Pete Wilson called the "driving force" behind the constitutional amendment. In late 2007, Nicholas convened a group, including Wilson, to consider putting a comprehensive victims' rights constitutional amendment on the ballot in California. He recruited legal scholars and former prosecutors to draft, rework and write the final version of the bill. In addition to Nicholas and Wilson, contributors included:

- Steve Twist, victims' rights legal expert and author of Arizona's Victims' Bill of Rights
- Douglas Pipes, legal scholar
- Douglas Beloof, professor at the Lewis & Clark Law School and board member of the National Crime Victims' Law Institute (NCVLI)
- Meg Garvin, executive director of the NCVLI
- Steve Ipsen, Los Angeles Deputy District Attorney and then-president of the Los Angeles Association of Deputy District Attorneys
- Todd Spitzer, then-state assemblyman, former Orange County Assistant District Attorney and Marsy's Law Legal Affairs Director, he was sworn in as District Attorney for Orange County in 2019.
- Paul G. Cassell, former federal judge, University of Utah law professor
- Kent Scheidegger, legal director of the Criminal Justice Legal Foundation
- Thomas Hiltachk, then-legal counsel to then-Governor Arnold Schwarzenegger
- Charles Fennessey, senior policy consultant to then-State Senator George Runner

In late February 2008, California non-profit corporation Marsy's Law: Justice for Crime Victims proposed Marsy's Law as a way of giving crime victims constitutionally protected rights such as notifications to victims and informing those involved in the criminal justice process of the Marsy's Law victim rights. Voters passed the Constitutional Amendment in November 2008 by a margin of 53.8% to 46.2%, despite being opposed by nearly every major newspaper in the state.

In 2009, Henry Nicholas formed Marsy's Law for All, which has the following objectives:

- Ensure that Marsy's Law is enforced throughout California;
- Help crime victims obtain quality legal representation;
- Unite the victims' rights movement by providing organizations with media, technology and other support;
- Pass an Amendment to the United States Constitution to protect the rights of victims nationwide

== Impact of Marsy's Law ==
Marsy's Law grants protective rights to an alleged victim of a crime and revokes certain rights of people accused of a crime to defend themselves.

Since its passage, when any alleged victim of crime is contacted by law enforcement, just as the accused are read their Miranda Rights, that victim is immediately informed of their Marsy's Rights and provided with "Marsy's Card", a small foldout containing a full description of each of the 17 Marsy's Rights, which is also available for download in 17 languages on the California Office of the Attorney General website. The California Attorney General has published these rights, which now are utilized by every law enforcement agency in the state. In addition, each of 58 county District Attorney's offices are required to inform alleged victims of these rights at the time a case is filed for criminal prosecution. In 2010, the California Peace Officer Standards and Training (POST) amended its Learning Domain 04 to include Marsy's Law Training in its Basic Police Academy.

Alleged victims now have the right to be heard at every stage of the legal criminal proceedings, which means before the judge makes a sentencing offer in the case. Prior to the passage of Proposition 9, most alleged victims did not address the court until after a conviction or plea. In addition, actions to bar alleged victims from the courtroom under a "motion to exclude witnesses" are now routinely denied. Alleged victims have a right to be present in court and prosecutors are trained to call alleged victims who will be witnesses in the case to testify first so they can remain in the courtroom for the entire trial.

Marsy's Law also gives alleged victims the right to be represented by counsel of their choosing, rather than relying on the prosecutor, who has a legal obligation to represent the people of their jurisdiction, and not the victim. Marsy's Law rights are enforceable and an adverse ruling against a victim in any context involving these rights can be appealed to a higher court by alleged victims through their own counsel or the District Attorney.

Post-conviction, victims' rights have been impacted by the dramatic increase in the length of time between parole hearings. Before Marsy's Law, the maximum parole denial was five years for convicted murderers and two years for all other crimes. Marsy Nicholas' mother, Marcella Leach, suffered a heart attack at the second parole hearing for Marsy's killer and was unable to attend subsequent hearing for many years. Now parole denials can be imposed for 7, 10 and even 15 years. Statistics show that in 2009, 20% or 656 inmates received parole denials of 7 years or more. In 2009, only 3.5% received denials of two years or less.

Citing the impact of Marsy's Law in extending the time California prison inmates must wait between hearings after parole has been denied, a Stanford University study of 32,000 California prisoners serving life sentences with the possibility of parole found the likelihood of parole for a convicted murderer is 6%. The study also found that the lifer population has increased from 8% of inmates in 1990 to 20% in 2010 and that the average number of years served is 20.

In another study on the impact of Marsy's Law on the parole process, UCLA law student Laura L. Richardson found a doubling in the average length of time imposed between parole hearings since California voters passed the Constitutional Amendment in 2008. But while victims may impact parole decisions, her analysis of 211 parole hearings failed to reveal an increase in victim participation in the parole process.

The California Supreme Court has said it will review two cases, In re Vicks and In re Russo, which address whether the parole impact of Marsy's Law is unconstitutional. In Vicks, the state Court of Appeal, Fourth Appellate District, Division One found that the risk of increased incarceration resulting from longer parole denials under Marsy's Law violated ex post facto principles if applied to prisoners sentenced before the law was passed. However, in Russo, a different panel from the same court ruled that the ability of a prisoner who had been denied parole to petition to advance the date of the next parole hearing protected Marsy's Law from an ex post facto challenge.

=== Similar laws in other states ===
The passage of this law in California has led to efforts in other states to pass similar laws. In Illinois, voters passed an amendment to the state constitution, called Marsy's Law for Illinois. In Ohio voters passed an amendment called the Ohio Crime Victims Bill of Rights (Marsy's Law). In April 2020, Wisconsin voters approved a version for their state's constitution. There are efforts to introduce similar Marsy's Laws in Florida, Georgia, Hawaii, Maine, Montana, Nevada, North Carolina, South Dakota, and Tennessee. Voters in Pennsylvania approved a Marsy's Law amendment to the state constitution in November 2019, but the Pennsylvania Supreme Court enjoined certification of the result. In December 2021, the court then held that the provision's inclusion of multiple essentially unrelated changes violated the state constitution's "single subject" limitation for each amendment.

== Overview of the Constitutional Amendment ==
Marsy's Law amended the state constitution and various state laws to (1) expand the legal rights of crime victims and the payment of restitution by criminal offenders, (2) restrict the early release of inmates, and (3) change the procedures for granting and revoking parole.

== Expansion of the rights of victims and restitution ==
=== Background ===
In June 1982, California voters approved Proposition 8, known as the Victims Bill of Rights.

Among other changes, the proposition amended the Constitution and various state laws to grant crime victims the right to be notified of, to attend, and to state their views at, sentencing and parole hearings. Other separately enacted laws have created other rights for crime victims, including the opportunity for a victim to obtain a judicial order of protection from harassment by a criminal defendant.

Proposition 8 established the right of crime victims to obtain restitution from any person who committed the crime that caused them to suffer a loss. Restitution often involves replacement of stolen or damaged property or reimbursement of costs that the victim incurred as a result of the crime. A court is required under current state law to order full restitution unless it finds compelling and extraordinary reasons not to do so.

Sometimes, however, judges do not order restitution. Proposition 8 also established a right to "safe, secure and peaceful" schools for students and staff of primary, elementary, junior high, and senior high schools.

=== Changes made by this measure ===
This measure requires that, without exception, restitution be ordered from offenders who have been convicted, in every case in which a victim suffers a loss. The measure also requires that any funds collected by a court or law enforcement agencies from a person ordered to pay restitution would go to pay that restitution first, in effect prioritizing those payments over other fines and obligations an offender may legally owe. The victim also is entitled to be compensated for legal fees in hiring counsel under Marsy's Law on the issues relating to the securing of restitution.

=== Notification and participation of victims in criminal justice proceedings ===
As noted above, Proposition 8 established a legal right for crime victims to be notified of, to attend, and to state their views at, sentencing and parole hearings. This measure expands these legal rights to include all public criminal proceedings, including the release from custody of offenders after their arrest, but before trial. In addition, victims are given the constitutional right to participate in other aspects of the criminal justice process, such as conferring with prosecutors on the charges filed and arguing for increased charges. Also, law enforcement and criminal prosecution agencies are required to provide victims with specified information, including details on victim's rights.

Marsy's Law provides crime victims and their families with a state constitutional right to:

- prevent the release of their confidential information or records to criminal defendants,
- refuse to be interviewed or provide pretrial testimony or other evidence requested on behalf of a criminal defendant,
- protection from harm from individuals accused of committing crimes against them, which includes informing the judge of safety concerns and seeking protective orders,
- the return of property no longer needed as evidence in criminal proceedings, and
- "finality" in criminal proceedings in which they are involved, and the right to due process and a speedy trial.

Some of these rights previously existed in statute.

The ACLU has contended that Marsy's Law undermines due process and represents a threat to existing constitutional rights. The organization argues that, under Marsy's Law, a victim would be able to refuse to provide exculpatory evidence to the defendant, the court, and the jury.

Criminal defense attorney Casey Hoff has expressed similar criticism of Marsy's Law:

The United States Constitution guarantees every person accused of a crime the right to be confronted with the witnesses against him or her and to obtain witnesses in his or her favor. Allowing alleged victims to refuse to provide evidence and discovery to the accused is, as we have learned throughout our history, the way innocent people get convicted of crimes and wrongfully imprisoned.

=== Other expansions of victims' legal rights ===
This measure expands the legal rights of crime victims in various other ways, including the following:

- The Constitution was changed to specify that the safety of a crime victim must be taken into consideration by judges in setting bail for persons arrested for crimes.
- The measure states that the right to safe schools includes community colleges, colleges, and universities.

== Restrictions on early release of inmates ==
=== Background ===
The state operates 33 state prisons and other facilities that had a combined adult inmate population of about 171,000 as of May 2008. The costs to operate the California Department of Corrections and Rehabilitation (CDCR) in 2008 are estimated to be approximately $10 billion. The average annual cost to incarcerate an inmate is estimated to be about $46,000. The state prison system is currently experiencing overcrowding because there are not enough permanent beds available for all inmates. As a result, gymnasiums and other rooms in state prisons have been converted to house some inmates.

Both the state Legislature and the courts have been considering various proposals that would reduce overcrowding, including the early release of inmates from state prison. At the time this analysis was prepared, none of these proposals had been adopted. State prison populations are also affected by credits granted to prisoners. These credits, which can be awarded for good behavior or participation in specific programs, reduce the amount of time a prisoner must serve before release.

Collectively, the state's 58 counties spend over $2.4 billion on county jails, which have a population in excess of 80,000. There are currently 20 counties where an inmate population cap has been imposed by the federal courts and an additional 12 counties with a self-imposed population cap. In counties with such population caps, inmates are sometimes released early to comply with the limit imposed by the cap. However, some sheriffs also use alternative methods of reducing jail populations, such as confining inmates to home detention with GPS devices such as ankle monitors.

=== Changes made ===
This measure amends the Constitution to require that criminal sentences imposed by the courts be carried out in compliance with the courts' sentencing orders and that such sentences shall not be "substantially diminished" by early release policies to alleviate overcrowding in prison or jail facilities. The measure directs that sufficient funding be provided by the Legislature or county boards of supervisors to house inmates for the full terms of their sentences, except for statutorily authorized credits which reduce those sentences.

== Changes affecting the granting and revocation of parole ==
=== Background ===
The Board of Parole Hearings conducts two different types of proceedings relating to parole. First, before CDCR releases an individual who has been sentenced to life in prison with the possibility of parole, the inmate must go before the board for a parole consideration hearing. Second, if parole is granted, the board has authority to return to state prison for up to a year any individual who has been released on parole but who subsequently commits a parole violation (called parole revocation).

A federal court order requires the state to provide legal counsel to parolees, including assistance at hearings related to parole revocation charges.

Because life-serving incarcerated individuals are unable to vote in California, the people most directly affected by Marsy's Law were unable to vote for or against it. These people are disproportionately men of color.

=== Changes made ===
This measure changed the procedures to be followed by the board when it considers the release from prison of inmates with a life sentence. Specifically:

- Previously, individuals whom the board did not release following their parole consideration hearing generally waited between one and five years for another parole consideration hearing. This measure extended the time before the next hearing to between 3 and 15 years, as determined by the board. Under Marsy's Law, lifers receive a 15-year deferral by default. However, inmates are able to periodically request that the board advance the hearing date.
- Crime victims are eligible to receive earlier notification in advance of parole consideration hearings. They now receive 90 days advance notice, instead of the prior 30 days.
- Previously, victims were able to attend and testify at parole consideration hearings with either their next of kin and up to two members of their immediate family, or two representatives. The measure removed the limit on the number of family members, and allows victim representatives to attend and testify at the hearing without regard to whether members of the victim's family were present.
- Those in attendance at parole consideration hearings are eligible to receive a transcript of the proceedings. This allows the victim to document the level of remorse and rehabilitation exhibited by the inmate in order to make the parole board aware at subsequent hearings if the inmates' behavior fails to demonstrate remorse or other failure to take personal responsibility for their crime.
- General Parole Revocation Procedures. This measure changed the board's parole revocation procedures for offenders after they have been paroled from prison. Under a federal court order in a case known as Valdivia v. Schwarzenegger, parolees were previously entitled to a hearing within 10 business days after being charged with violation of their parole to determine if there was probable cause to detain them until their revocation charges were resolved. The measure extended the deadline for this hearing to 15 days. The prior order also required that parolees arrested for parole violations have a hearing to resolve the revocation charges within 35 days. This measure extended this timeline to 45 days. It also provides for the appointment of legal counsel to parolees facing revocation charges only if the board determines, on a case-by-case basis, that the parolee is indigent because of the complexity of the matter or because of the parolee's mental or educational incapacity, the parolee appears incapable of speaking effectively in their defense. Because this measure does not provide for counsel at all parole revocation hearings, and because the measure does not provide counsel for parolees who are not indigent, a federal judge held it was in conflict with the Valdivia court order, which requires that all parolees be provided legal counsel. However, in March 2010, the Federal Ninth Circuit Court of Appeals rejected the lower court ruling and directed it to reconcile its ruling with Proposition 9.

=== Parole outcomes ===
Marsy's law is one of several determining factors considered when determining parole suitability. If an individual is found unsuitable for parole, the board commissioners determine the length of time until the next opportunity to reconsider parole. Marsy's Law enabled longer waits between parole hearings. The board issued 5-year denials for only 18% of parole suitability cases presented to them before Marsy's Law. After Marsy's law, 57% of incarcerated individuals received a denial length longer than 5 years. As of 2011, 75% of all suitability hearings presented to the board have received a denial length of 3 years or more. An incarcerated individual may receive a shorter denial if commissioners are presented with evidence that reveals the incarcerated individual's potential suitability for parole. Public safety concerns are a main reason for long denial lengths.

Marsy's Law allows victims to attend and speak at parole hearings. Some research says that the participation of victims in parole hearings has a significant association with the parole board rejecting parole applications; other studies do not find the same effects. However, as the 1982 California Proposition 8 already allowed victims to participate in the parole process, this does not constitute a significant change.

== Newspaper endorsements ==
=== Editorial boards opposed ===
The Los Angeles Times encouraged a "no" vote on 9, saying, "If the concern is protection of families from further victimization, as proponents claim, that goal can be met without granting families a new and inappropriate role in prosecutions."

Other editorial boards opposed:

- Pasadena Star News
- Press Democrat
- Press Enterprise
- Tracy Press
- San Diego Union Tribune
- Orange County Register
- Sacramento Bee
- San Francisco Chronicle
- Bakersfield Californian
- La Opinion
- Fresno Bee
- Woodland Daily Democrat
- San Jose Mercury News
- Chico Enterprise-Record
- Stockton Record
- New York Times
- Contra Costa Times
- San Gabriel Valley Tribune
- Napa Valley Register
- Salinas Californian
- Monterey County Herald
- Long Beach Press-Telegram
- Desert Dispatch
- The Vacaville Reporter
- Los Angeles Daily News
- Santa Cruz Sentinel
- The Modesto Bee

=== Editorial boards in favor ===
- The Eureka Reporter

== Results ==
Electoral results by county

Proposition 9
Choice	Votes	%
For	6,682,465	53.84
Against	5,728,968	46.16
Total	12,411,433	100.00
Valid votes	12,411,433	90.31
Invalid/blank votes	1,331,744	9.69
Total votes	13,743,177	100.00
Registered voters/turnout		79.4
