= Icera =

British multinational fabless semiconductor company

Icera Inc.
- Type: Subsidiary
- Industry: Semiconductors
- Founded: 2002
- Defunct: 2015
- Headquarters: Bristol, United Kingdom
- Key people: Stan Boland (President and CEO)
- Parent: Nvidia Corporation (2011–2015)
- Website: http://www.icerasemi.com

Icera Inc. was a British multinational fabless semiconductor company headquartered in Bristol, United Kingdom. It developed soft modem chipsets for the mobile devices market, including mobile broadband datacards, USB sticks, and embedded modems for smartphones, laptops, netbooks, tablets, e-books and other mobile broadband devices.

Icera had research and development sites in China, France, the United Kingdom and the United States and customer engineering and sales offices in China, Japan, Korea, Taiwan, the United States and Europe.

On 9 May 2011 it was announced that Nvidia Corporation had agreed to acquire Icera for US$367 million in cash from its venture capital owners, which included Accel Partners, Amadeus Capital Partners, Atlas Venture, Balderton Capital and DFJ Esprit.

On 5 May 2015 Nvidia Corporation announced that the Icera subsidiary would wind down its operations.

== History ==
Icera was founded in April 2002 by Stan Boland, Steve Allpress, Simon Knowles and Nigel Toon. The company is staffed by a team employed in custom processor design, wireless algorithm development, CMOS RF design, customer support and wireless handset platform integration. In January 2003, Icera completed a $10M Series A round from a major investor. Later in the year, Icera inaugurated two offices in Bristol, United Kingdom and in Japan. In July 2004, Icera completed another $32.5M Series B funding round and, later that year, licensed TTPCom's 2G/3G protocol stack. In January 2005, the Sophia Antipolis offices in France were opened. In September 2005, Icera's first 90 nm Livanto ICE8020 chips were sampled to Seiko Instruments Inc, for a first product development for Vodafone KK. In March 2006, the company completed its third financing round raising $60M Series C funds. Icera launched its Espresso 200 platform in 2006, and two new offices were opened in Austin, Texas, and in Cambridge, United Kingdom.

Icera acquired Sirific Wireless in May 2008, adding CMOS RF to its portfolio. In the same month, the company began to ship its 65 nm Livanto ICE8040 baseband chips and the associated Espresso 300 reference design was launched. At the end of that year, the company inaugurated its Chinese office in Shanghai and announced a total of $70M of Series CC financing, including venture debt.

In June 2009, Icera announced that its platform is supported by Nvidia Tegra-based MIDs. In late June 2009, Option launched a new iCON 505 HSPA USB modem with TeliaSonera in Sweden, which is powered by the Icera Livanto baseband chipset. In December 2009, Icera announced that its Livanto chipset is powering the Sierra Wireless AirCard USB 305. In April 2010, Icera announced that its Livanto chipset is powering the USB modem from LG Mobile Phones which launched with AT&T in the United States: the AT&T USBConnect Turbo. In May 2010, it was announced that Icera's Livanto chipset and IceClear interference-aware technology were being used in Vodafone's K3805-Z USB stick, boosting mobile broadband reliability and connection speeds for Vodafone customers. The Vodafone K3805-Z is the world's first USB modem to incorporate Icera's IceClear interference-aware technology. In May 2010, Icera secured a further $45M in Series DD financing, which will accelerate its growth. To date, Icera has raised $258M in venture investments. In August 2010, Icera announced that it had opened its second customer support center in Xi'an, China.

On 9 May 2011 it was announced that Nvidia Corporation had agreed to acquire Icera for $435.7M in cash.

On 5 May 2015 Nvidia Corporation announced that Icera would wind down operations.

== Products ==
- Livanto Chipsets – Chipsets for mobile broadband cellular modem devices. Livanto is the world's first wireless soft modem.
- Baseband chips
  - ICE8060 (sampling in H2 2010)
  - ICE8042 (up to 21 Mbit/s)
  - ICE8040 (up to 21 Mbit/s)
  - ICE8020 (up to 3.6 Mbit/s)
- Radio chips
  - ICE9225 (sampling in H2 2010)
  - ICE8260 (2G/3G/4G)
  - ICE8215 (2G/3G)
- Power Management chips
  - ICE8145 (BGA or wafer-level CSP package)
- Espresso Reference Platforms – reference platforms for mobile broadband data devices and next generation smartphones
  - Espresso 400 Data Platform (sampling in H2 2010)
  - Espresso 302 Data Platform
  - Espresso 300 Data Platform
  - Espresso 200 Data Platform
