= Henry Nicholas =

American businessman

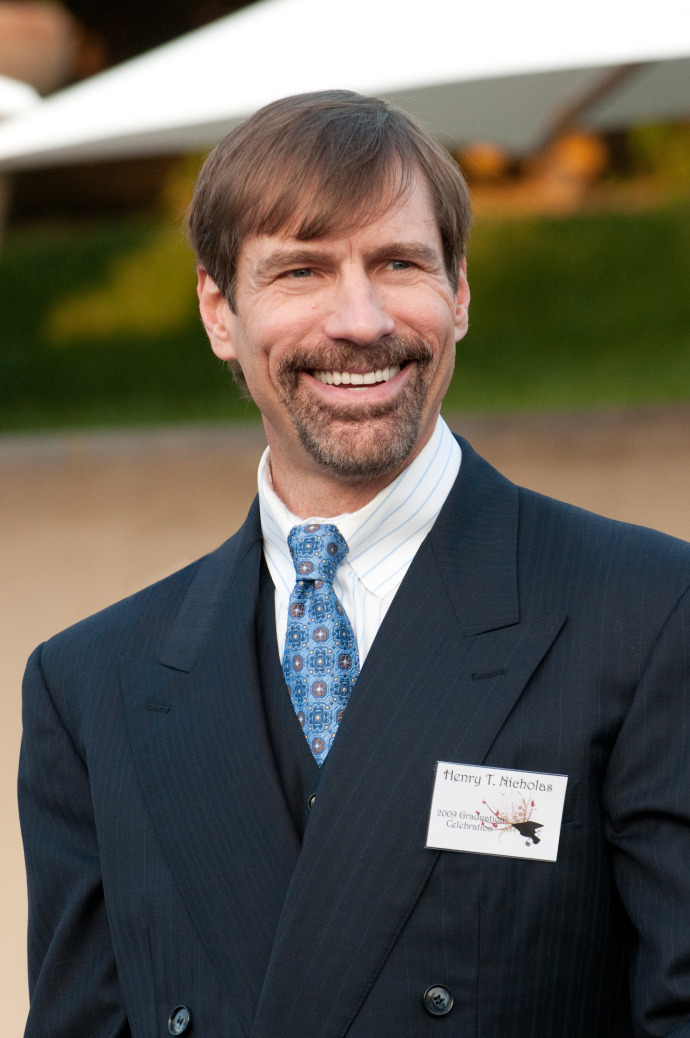
- Nicholas in 2009
- Born: Henry Thompson Nicholas III; October 8, 1959 (age 67); Cincinnati, Ohio, U.S.
- Education: University of California Los Angeles (BS, MS, Ph.D., Electrical Engineering, 1998 PhD)
- Title: Former co-chairman, president and CEO of Broadcom Corporation; Chairman of the Henry T. Nicholas, III Foundation; Chairman of Marsy's Law for All
- Spouse: Stacey Nicholas (m. 1987; div. 2008)
- Children: 3
- Parent(s): Henry T. Nicholas Jr., Marcella Nicholas Leach

Henry Thompson Nicholas III (born October 8, 1959) is an American businessman who is a co-founder of Broadcom Corporation, and former co-chairman of its board, president, and chief executive officer (CEO) of the company. As of 2025, Nicholas is the 99th wealthiest person in the world according to Forbes billionaire's list with a net worth of US$21.3 billion.

== Early life and education ==
Henry Nicholas was born in Cincinnati, Ohio, to Marcella and Henry T. Nicholas Jr. When Nicholas was four, his parents divorced and he moved with his mother and sister to Los Angeles, California.

His mother later married Robert Leach, a journalist and Hollywood screenwriter. Nicholas attended elementary schools in Malibu, and progressed to Santa Monica High School. Nicholas has dyslexia.

After attending the United States Air Force Academy in Colorado Springs, Colorado, Nicholas graduated from UCLA School of Engineering in 1982 with a Bachelor of Science degree in electrical engineering. He earned a master's degree in 1985, and a PhD. in electrical engineering from UCLA in 1998. His doctoral dissertation became the basis for the development of the integrated circuit (IC) that Broadcom sold.

== Early career ==
After graduating from UCLA in the 1980s, Nicholas worked at TRW in Redondo Beach, California, where he met Henry Samueli, his future business partner, who was a professor of engineering at UCLA. Nicholas later moved to PairGain Technologies in Cerritos, where he was director of microelectronics. He left PairGain in 1991 to start Broadcom Corporation with Samueli.

== Broadcom ==
Nicholas and Samueli founded Broadcom in the spare bedroom of Nicholas' Redondo Beach condominium in 1991. Each partner invested $5,000 of their own money, and they floated the company in 1998.

Nicholas retired from Broadcom in 2003, ostensibly to work on his marriage.

== Philanthropy ==
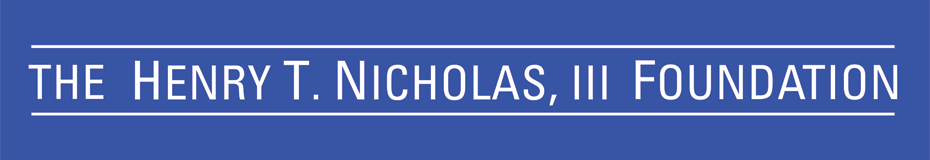
Logo of the Henry T. Nicholas III Foundation

In 2003, Nicholas and his wife founded the Henry T. and Stacey Nicholas Foundation, a private nonprofit foundation whose goals were to invest in education, youth sports, technology, medical research, victims' rights and national defense. Following their separation in 2006, it was renamed The Henry T. Nicholas III Foundation.

In 2008, the Nicholas Academic Center was opened in downtown Santa Ana, California, in partnership with retired Orange County judge Jack Mandel, on whose program the schools are based. The second center opened in 2009 on the campus of Valley High School in Santa Ana.

In 2004, Nicholas donated $10 million to St. Margaret's Episcopal School in Orange County and for the formation of a partnership with the University of California, Irvine's Henry Samueli School of Engineering to explore the application of technology to enhance learning. In addition, Nicholas provided St. Margaret scholarships to students from Santa Ana. Nicholas also supports Oakland Military Institute.

Nicholas has financially supported South Coast Repertory, the Bowers Museum in Santa Ana, and Orange County Performing Arts Center.

== Personal life ==
In 1987, Nicholas married Stacey, a former electrical engineer, with whom he had three children. Nicholas is now divorced and separated from his later girlfriends Melissa Montero and Ashley Christine Fargo. He lives in Newport Coast, California. In April 2008, he admitted himself to an alcohol rehabilitation program of the Betty Ford Center and completed his treatment at Cliffside Malibu.

== Criminal charges ==
In June 2008, Nicholas and other Broadcom executives were indicted for stock fraud and options backdating. At the same time, Nicholas was also indicted on drug charges. The charges caused considerable scandal, and were the subject of much speculation in the press.

Judge Cormac J. Carney threw out the stock fraud and options backdating charges in December 2009. The drug charges were dropped in January 2010. The judge, in dismissing the charges, accused the prosecution of a "shameful" campaign of witness intimidation aimed at securing unjustified convictions.

In August 2018, Nicholas was arrested in Las Vegas on suspicion of drug trafficking after a variety of drugs, including marijuana, heroin, cocaine, methamphetamine and ecstasy were found in his hotel suite. In August 2019, he entered an Alford plea to two felony drug-possession charges; he agreed to donate $1 million to a drug treatment-and-rehabilitation program, to perform 250 hours of community service, and to go to drug counseling. In exchange, the prosecution dismissed five more-serious drug trafficking charges and did not seek a prison sentence. The case was later dismissed.
