= BroadLight =

Israeli fabless semiconductor company

BroadLight.
- Industry: Semiconductors
- Founded: June 2000
- Founder: Ran Dror; David Levi; Haim Ben Amram; Didi Ivancovsky; Raanan Ivry
- Headquarters: Herzliya, Israel
- Key people: Raanan Gewirtzman, Chief Executive Officer; Chee Kwan, VP Sales; Didi Ivancovsky, Founder, VP Carriers Strategy; Doron Tal, VP Business Development & Marketing; Dror Heldenberg, CFO; Eli Weitz, CTO; Gal Sitton, VP Systems; Igor Elkanovich, VP VLSI
- Products: Fiber Access & Embedded Processors
- Number of employees: 140
- Website: www.broadlight.com

BroadLight is a fabless semiconductor company which designs, manufactures and markets Fiber Access and embedded processors System-on-a-chip (SoC). Founded in 2000 by Ran Dror, David Levi, Haim Ben Amram, Didi Ivancovsky and Raanan Ivry, it is headquartered in Herzeliya, Israel with offices in the United States, China, Taiwan and Korea.

== Market ==
BroadLight predicted that the fiber-to-the-home market would outpace xDSL copper broadband installations and that the market would require and benefit from highly integrated Fiber Access semiconductor SoC. The company was recognized to achieve significant market share and an established top-tier customer position

== Intellectual Property ==
Since 2004 BroadLight has been awarded multiple patents in the area of fiber access and CPE network processing.

== Acquisition by Broadcom ==
In April 2012 Broadcom Corporation acquired BroadLight for $230M in a cash transaction.
