= Gigle Networks =

- Type: Fabless semiconductor company
- Founded: 2005
- Founder: Juan Carlos Riveiro, Jed Hurwitz, Hakan Fouren, Mike Wilson
- Defunct: 2010
- Fate: Acquired by Broadcom
- Successor: Broadcom
- Headquarters: Barcelona, Catalonia, Spain; Edinburgh, Scotland, UK; Redwood City, California, USA
- Products: Home networks, Semiconductor Devices
- Owner: Broadcom
- Website: giglenetworks.com at the Wayback Machine (archived 2009-11-21)

Gigle Networks (formerly known as Gigle Semiconductor) was a provider of high performance system-on-a-chip semiconductor devices and intelligent switching technology for home network, IPTV, consumer electronics and smart grid applications. The company was based in Barcelona, Spain, Edinburgh, UK, and Redwood City, California.

== History ==
Gigle was a venture capital backed privately held company. The company completed a Series A funding round of $11 million in January 2006, led by Accel Partners and Pond Venture Partners; and a Series B funding round of $20 million in November 2007, led by Scottish Equity Partners with participation from Accel Partners and Pond Venture Partners. In December 2010, the company was acquired by Broadcom for $75 million.

Gigle announced 1 Gbit/s physical layer throughput trials in December 2006. Gigle was involved in multimedia communications standards such as IEEE P1901 and G.hn. Gigle Networks was a board member of the HomePlug Powerline Alliance, a co-founder of the Homegrid Forum a member of the Home Gateway Initiative and the Broadband Forum.
