= Cliffside Malibu =

- Discovery Behavioral Health

Geography
- Location: Malibu, California, United States
- Coordinates: 34.034714°N 118.829351°W

Organization
- Care system: Private
- Type: Addiction treatment
- Network: Discovery Behavioral Health

History
- Founded: 2005

Links
- Website: www.cliffsidemalibu.com
- Lists: Hospitals in California

Cliffside Malibu is a drug rehabilitation center in Malibu, California, United States. It is notable for being frequently used by celebrities including Lindsay Lohan and Ty Lawson when they have been sentenced to rehabilitation. Kelly Stephenson has been the CEO of Cliffside Malibu since July 2018.

Former CEO Richard Taite had originally bought a house in Malibu to retire, but he said he decided to build a sober living facility there instead, "to give back." Taite had previously overcome his own addiction to crack cocaine.

== Overview ==
=== 2005–2018 ===
According to former CEO Richard Taite, Cliffside Malibu has treated 2,000 patients as of November 2014 and that the facility has a capacity of approximately 108 beds. According to Taite, between 40 and 45 percent of Cliffside Malibu's patients were addicted to prescription drugs when it opened as a licensed facility in 2005. During a discussion of opiate addiction on a May 2016 episode of Real Time with Bill Maher, Taite stated that the percentage of patients addicted to prescription drugs upon entering Cliffside Malibu had increased to 90 percent.

Treatment at Cliffside Malibu is more costly than the average facility. Patients pay up to $80,000 a month for treatment. The center provides organic food and luxury-hotel amenities, including a heated pool and turndown service.

Cliffside Malibu assigns each patient a dedicated therapist to aid in identifying underlying issues that caused their addiction. The facility also uses Orthomolecular medicine, a form of alternative medicine.

=== 2018–present ===
In June 2018, Discovery Behavioral Health purchased Cliffside Malibu. Founder Richard Taite stepped down from his role as Chief Executive Officer (CEO). Kelly Stephenson, who started her career at Cliffside Malibu in 2015 as Chief Operations Officer (COO), was appointed as the new CEO.

In November 2018, the Woolsey Fire forced Cliffside Malibu to evacuate 72 patients to a hotel where they continued addiction treatment. The fire destroyed five Cliffside Malibu properties. Less than two months after the fire, Cliffside Malibu reopened its first house in January 2019, with the remaining facilities opening later that year.

Adherence to Centers for Disease Control and Prevention protocols allowed Cliffside Malibu to remain open during the COVID-19 pandemic, with residential and outpatient treatment available.

== Addiction treatment ==
=== Clean and Sober Media, LLC ===
Cliffside Malibu and its former CEO Richard Taite were mentioned in The Verge after reporting done by that publication in 2017 disclosed that "several popular publications covering addiction and treatment double as marketing operations for treatment centers". The Verge's disclosure included information that two of these publications, The Fix and Rehab Reviews, were owned by Clean and Sober Media, LLC., which in turn is financially controlled by Richard Taite. This relationship had not previously been disclosed in disclaimers by the publications to their readers. Taite's attorney responded in The Verge piece, saying "Any implication that the content of an editorial review, including its aesthetics, is influenced by whether a treatment center has paid for advertising is false." In 2018 it was reported that Cliffside Malibu and Center for Discovery, which is owned by private equity firm Webster Capital, were merging to become Discovery Behavioral Health. According to the Institute for the Advancement of Behavioral Healthcare, "Clean and Sober Media was not part of the Webster Capital transaction."
