= Xactly Corporation =

American enterprise software company

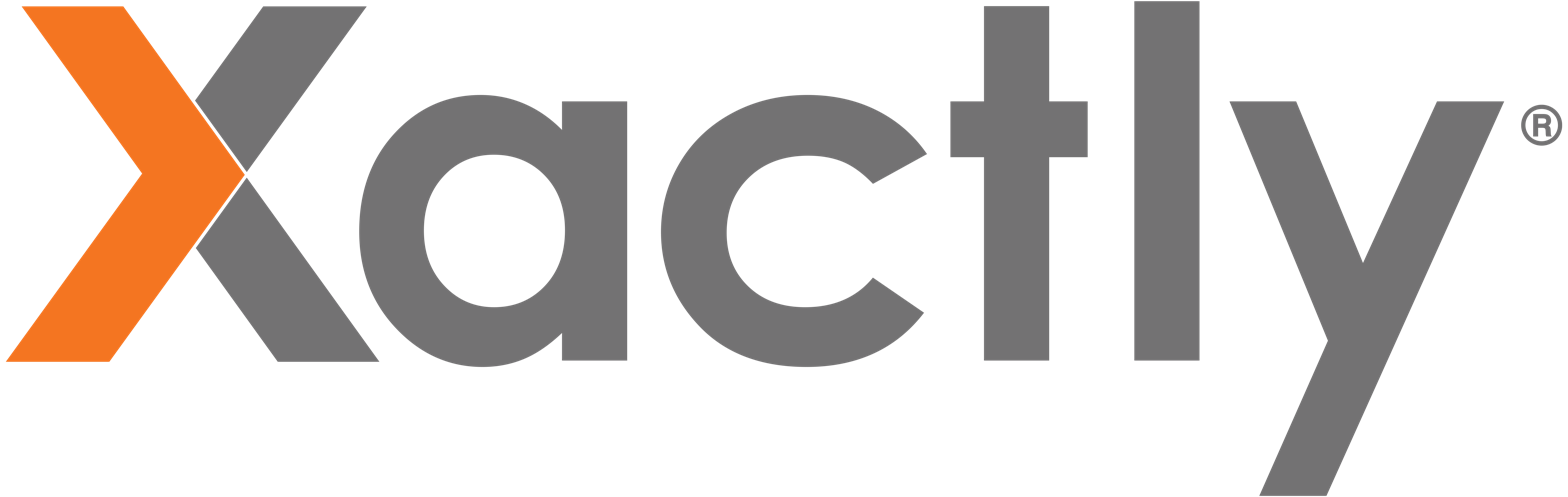
- Type: Private
- Traded as: NYSE: XTLY (formerly)
- Industry: Software as a Service
- Founded: 2005; 21 years ago
- Headquarters: San Jose, California
- Key people: Christopher W. Cabrera, Founder & CEO
- Products: Incentives Platform
- Services: Enterprise software
- Owner: Vista Equity Partners
- Number of employees: 500-1000
- Website: www.xactlycorp.com

Xactly Corporation was a pure-play, SaaS company that provides cloud-based enterprise software and services. They offer tools to allow for sales performance management, sales effectiveness, sales compensation, and employee engagement.

Xactly Corporation is headquartered in San Jose, California.

The company raised $116 million in funding since its inception in 2005. Its investors include Rembrandt Venture Partners, Alloy Ventures, Key Venture Partners, Bay Partners, Outlook Ventures, Illuminate Ventures, Silicon Valley Bank, Wellington Financial, and Salesforce.com.

== Company history ==
Xactly Corp was created on March 1, 2005, by Founder and CEO Christopher W. Cabrera and Co-Founder and Managing Director Satish K. Palvai. The company is headquartered in San Jose, California.

Xactly Corp acquired Centive, an automated incentive compensation management technology company, in 2009.

On July 31, 2017, the company was taken private by Vista Equity Partners and was delisted from the New York Stock Exchange.
