= Gadzoox =

Storage area network company

Gadzoox Networks, Inc.
- Founded: 1996; 30 years ago
- Defunct: 2003; 23 years ago
- Fate: Bankruptcy; acquired by Broadcom
- Headquarters: San Jose, California

Gadzoox Networks, Inc. produced hardware and software for the entry-level storage area network market. Products, which included Slingshot switches and Geminix routers, supported SCSI-FCP and focused on allowing servers to communicate with storage devices via FC-AL switches and hubs.

In 2000, at the peak of the dot-com bubble, the company was valued at $2 billion; however, after filing bankruptcy in 2002, its assets were acquired by Broadcom in 2003 for $5.8 million, a 99.9% decline in value.

== History ==
The company was founded in 1996. The name Gadzoox was supposed to be temporary but was retained at the urging of investors.

In July 1999, during the dot-com bubble, the company became a public company via an initial public offering, pricing 3.5 million shares at $21/share. Shares closed at $74.81/share on their first day of trading, giving the company a market capitalization of $1.97 billion.

In March 2000, the company acquired SmartSAN for $23.5 million.

In June 2000, the company launched Axxess.

In August 2000, Bill Sickler, the CEO of the company, and Christine E. Munson, the CFO of the company, resigned after announcing a financial restatement.

In April 2001, the company launched the Slingshot 4218 switch.

In January 2002, the company raised $8.9 million in funding.

Sales declined from $48 million in the fiscal year ended March 2000 to $22 million in the fiscal year ended March 2002.

In June 2002, Steve Dalton was named CEO.

In August 2002, the company filed bankruptcy.

In March 2003, Broadcom acquired the assets of the company for $5.3 million.
