= Bruce J. Tromberg =

American chemist

Bruce Tromberg
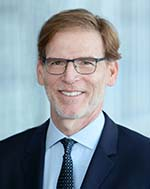
- Born: Bruce Jason Tromberg
- Education: Vanderbilt University (BS); University of Tennessee, Knoxville (MS, PhD)
- Scientific career
- Fields: Photochemistry
- Institutions: University of California, Irvine, Beckman Laser Institute, National Institute of Biomedical Imaging and Bioengineering
- Doctoral advisor: Tuan Vo-Dinh
- Website: https://www.nibib.nih.gov/about-nibib/staff/bruce-j-tromberg

Bruce Jason Tromberg is an American photochemist and a leading researcher in the field of biophotonics. He is the director of the National Institute of Biomedical Imaging and Bioengineering (NIBIB) within the National Institutes of Health (NIH). Before joining NIH, he was Professor of Biomedical Engineering at The Henry Samueli School of Engineering and of Surgery at the School of Medicine, University of California, Irvine. He was the principal investigator of the Laser Microbeam and Medical Program (LAMMP), and the Director of the Beckman Laser Institute and Medical Clinic at Irvine. He was a co-leader of the Onco-imaging and Biotechnology Program of the NCI Chao Family Comprehensive Cancer Center at Irvine.

Tromberg is actively engaged in translational research, developing biophotonics technologies while working closely with clinicians and patients to explore their possible clinical application in areas such as breast cancer, heart disease and obesity. He is considered "a pioneer in biophotonics through the continuous development of advanced technologies in diffuse optical spectroscopy and multi-modal imaging." He received the 2015 Michael S. Feld Biophotonics Award "as an advocate for and leader of the Biophotonics Community and for pioneering the development and clinical application of spatially and temporally modulated light imaging."

== Education ==
Tromberg received a B.A., in Chemistry from Vanderbilt University in 1979, and a M.S.(1983) and Ph.D.(1988) in Chemistry, working with Tuan Vo-Dinh at the University of Tennessee. He worked at Oak Ridge National Laboratory as a predoctoral fellow from 1986 to 1988.

== Career ==
Tromberg worked with Michael W. Berns as a Hewitt Foundation postdoctoral fellow at the Beckman Laser Institute from 1988–1989, and joined the faculty of the University of California, Irvine in 1990. He has held a number of positions at Irvine during his career. Ongoing appointments include Director of the Laser Microbeam and Medical Program (LAMMP), beginning with its formation in 1997; Professor in the Departments of Biomedical Engineering and Surgery, as of July 2002; Director of the Beckman Laser Institute and Medical Clinic, as of October 2003; and Co-Leader of the Onco-Imaging and Spectroscopy Program of the Chao Family Comprehensive Cancer Center, as of 2004. Tromberg has supervised the research of at least 8 postdoctoral fellows and 17 Ph.D. students. He has published more than 400 publications and holds at least 17 patents.

As of 2011, Tromberg was one of the ten top researchers to be funded by the National Institutes of Health (NIH) in the field of optical coherence tomography (OCT). Tromberg is principal investigator of The Laser Microbeam and Medical Program (LAMMP) at the Beckman Laser Institute (BLI), which received funding as a NIH Biomedical Technology Resource Center as part of a multi-year program beginning in 1997. He has chaired NIH workshops on imaging related topics and has been on the advisory council on optical technologies for the US Public Health Service.

Tromberg has been a member of the International Society for Optical Engineering (SPIE) Publications Committee for a number of years. He became a member of the editorial board of SPIE's Journal of Biomedical Optics when it was founded in 1996, and served as its editor-in-chief from 1999 to 2010. He also served as an editor of the journal Optical Engineering. He served on the SPIE Board of Directors from 2003 to 2006.

Tromberg is a fellow of the Optical Society of America (OSA), and has served as a co-chair at OSA meetings related to biomedical optics. He has been active both as a contributor to and a guest editor of the journals Applied Optics and Lasers in Medicine and Surgery.

Tromberg was selected as director of the National Institute of Biomedical Imaging and Bioengineering (NIBIB) within the National Institutes of Health (NIH) on September 6, 2018, and sworn in on January 7, 2019.

== Research ==
Tromberg has used non-linear optical microscopy for high resolution functional mapping of physiological processes in living cells and tissues, and ultrafast laser techniques for the multi-dimensional visualization of cell and tissue physiology. Tromberg's research interests include studying the optical transport properties of both normal and malignant tissues, developing optical techniques for use in tissue monitoring, detection of physiological changes, and photodynamic therapy. Tromberg is interested in developing non-invasive methods for in vivo monitoring and imaging using non-linear optical microscopy and diffuse optical spectroscopy. He is a specialist in the interaction of laser radiation with tissue, and has developed diagnostic techniques to analyze the effects of laser energy on tissue. Tromberg has been the principal investigator on a number of major projects relating to breast cancer, which have been supported by the National Institutes of Health the U.S. Army, the California Breast Cancer Research Program, and the National Science Foundation, among others.

Tromberg and others in his laboratory have developed new methods for broadband diffuse optical spectroscopy (DOS) including diffuse optical spectroscopic imaging (DOSI); spatial frequency domain imaging (SFDI); and a type of optical tomography combining techniques for second harmonic generation tomography (SHG) and two-photon excited fluorescence (TPEF).

In broadband diffuse optical spectroscopy (DOS), frequency-domain photon migration (FDPM) and time-independent near-infrared (NIR) spectroscopy are combined to measure absorption and scattering in thick tissue. Observations of the optical properties of absorption and scattering from FDPM are then analyzed and used to display images of hemoglobin, oxygen, blood volume, water and fat content, and cellular structure of the tissues examined.

Tromberg has developed broadband diffuse optical spectroscopic imaging (DOSI), used to measure the magnitude of light scattering and absorption in thick tissues, and is using this method for in vivo functional imaging to detect and monitor cancer. For DOSI, near-infrared light shines onto tissue and the amount of light that is reflected back is measured. The technique can be used to create images of tissue as deep as several centimeters below the skin's surface, detecting signs of metabolic activity such as blood flow, oxygenation, fat content, water content, and fluid build-up. Changes can be viewed in real time, instantaneously, without disturbing the tissue. This allows researchers to better understand and monitor changes in tissue growth and in response to treatment.

SFDI is similar, using near infrared light to detect and measure oxygen saturation, water, and fat content. The information is used to describe tissue at multiple depths, to map an entire area such as a tumor, and to monitor changes.

In multiphoton microscopy, Tromberg has developed a noninvasive technique combining two photon excited fluorescence microscopy (TPEF) and second-harmonic generation (SHG), taking measurements at different wavelengths and creating a three-dimensional representation of unstained in vivo thick tissue.

== Publications ==
His publications include peer-reviewed papers, conference papers, book chapters, and patents. Among his most important papers are:

- Zoumi, A.; Yeh, A.; Tromberg, B.J. (2002). "Imaging Cells And Extracellular Matrix In Vivo Using Second-Harmonic Generation And Two-Photon Excited Fluorescence". Proceedings of the National Academy of Sciences. 99 (17): 11014–11019. Bibcode:2002PNAS...9911014Z. doi:10.1073/pnas.172368799. PMC 123202. PMID 12177437.
- Shah, N.; Cerussi, A.; Eker, C.; Espinoza, J.; Butler, J.; Fishkin, J.; Hornung, R.; Tromberg; Breast Tissue, Human (2001). "Noninvasive functional optical spectroscopy of human breast tissue". Proceedings of the National Academy of Sciences. 98 (8): 4420–4425. Bibcode:2001PNAS...98.4420S. doi:10.1073/pnas.071511098. PMC 31850. PMID 11287650.
- Fishkin, J. B.; Coquoz, O.; Anderson, E. R.; Brenner, M.; Tromberg, B. J. (1997). "Frequency-domain photon migration measurements of normal and malignant tissue optical properties in a human subject". Applied Optics. 36 (1): 10–20. Bibcode:1997ApOpt..36...10F. doi:10.1364/ao.36.000010. PMID 18250643. S2CID 28010471.
- Tromberg, B.J.; Coquoz, O.; Fishkin, J.B.; Pham, T.; Anderson, E.R.; Butler, J.; Cahn, M.; Gross, J.D.; Venugopalan, V.; Pham, D. (1997). "Non-Invasive Measurements of Breast Tissue Optical Properties Using Frequency-Domain Photon Migration". Philosophical Transactions of the Royal Society B. 352 (1354): 661–668. Bibcode:1997RSPTB.352..661T. doi:10.1098/rstb.1997.0047. PMC 1691955. PMID 9232853.

== Awards and honors ==
- 2016, Fellow Member of the Optical Society of America (OSA)
- 2015, Michael S. Feld Biophotonics Award, OSA
- 2007, Fellow, International Society for Optical Engineering (SPIE)
- 2006, Fellow of the American Institute for Medical and Biological Engineering (AIMBE)
- 2004, U.S. Co-Chair, Gordon Research Conference on Lasers in Biology and Medicine
- 2001, OE Magazine Technology Innovator Award
- 2000, Coherent Biophotonics Young Investigator Award
- 2000, Avon Foundation Breast Cancer Research Scholar
- 1999, Cornelius Hopper Innovation Award, California Breast Cancer Research Symposium
- 1987, R&D 100 Award, for dissertation research on antibody-based fiber optic sensors
