= Mesbahi =

Mesbahi or Al Mesbahi is a surname. Notable people with the surname include:

- Abdellah Mesbahi (1936–2016), Moroccan film director
- Abdeslam Al Mesbahi (born 1954), Moroccan politician
- Gholamreza Mesbahi-Moghaddam (born 1951), Iranian politician
- Imane Mesbahi (born 1964), Moroccan actress and filmmaker
- Jihad Al Mesbahi (born 1983), Moroccan Senior Exotics Trader, son of Abdeslam Al Mesbahi
- Mehran Mesbahi, Iranian-American academic
- Mohamed Mesbahi (born 1969), Moroccan boxer
