= UC Irvine Samueli School of Engineering =

Engineering school of the University of California, Irvine

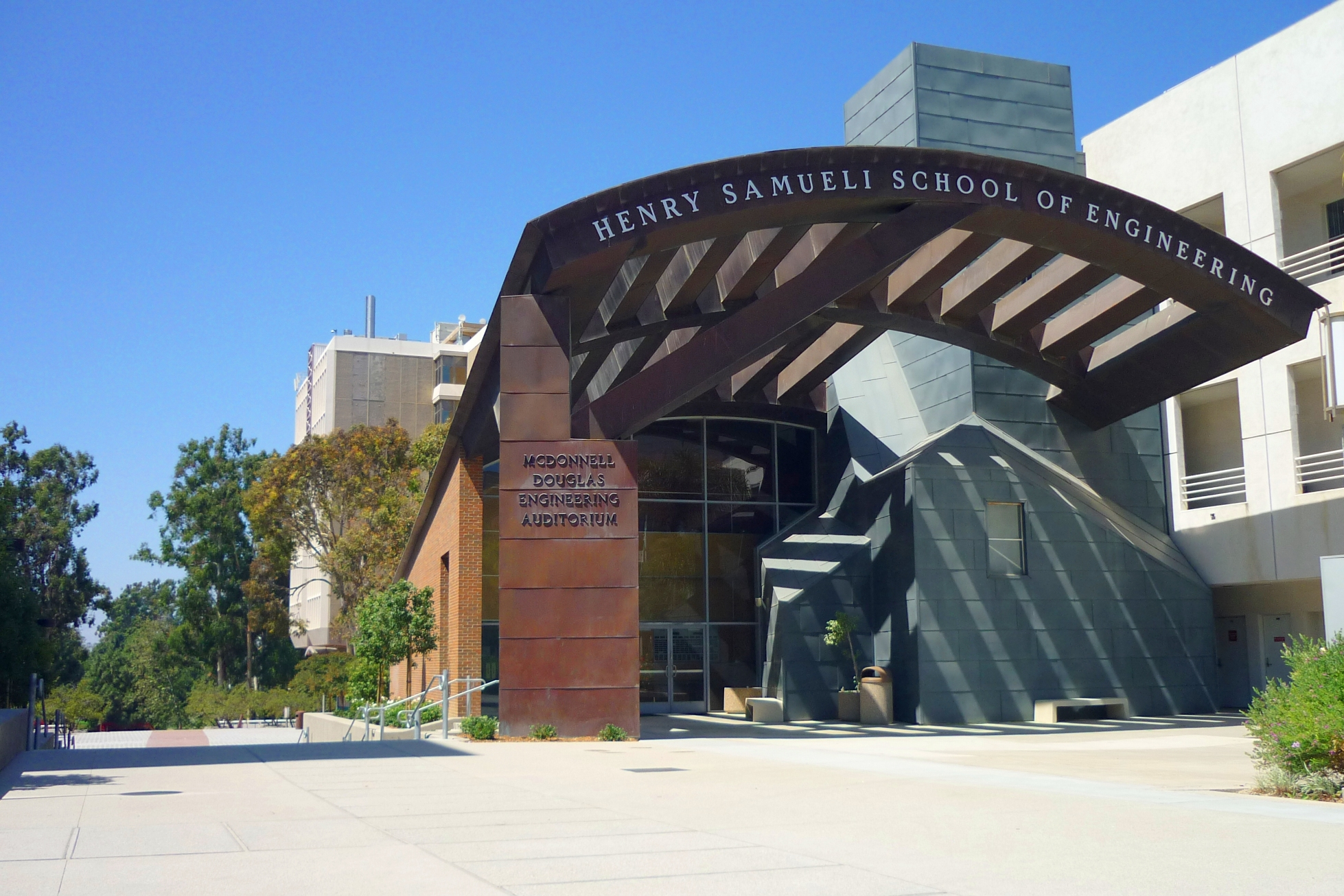
- Henry Samueli School of Engineering Engineering Hall at UCI Campus
- Type: Engineering school
- Established: 1965
- Affiliations: University of California, Irvine
- Dean: Magnus Egerstedt
- Location: 33°38′38″N 117°50′29″W
- Website: engineering.uci.edu
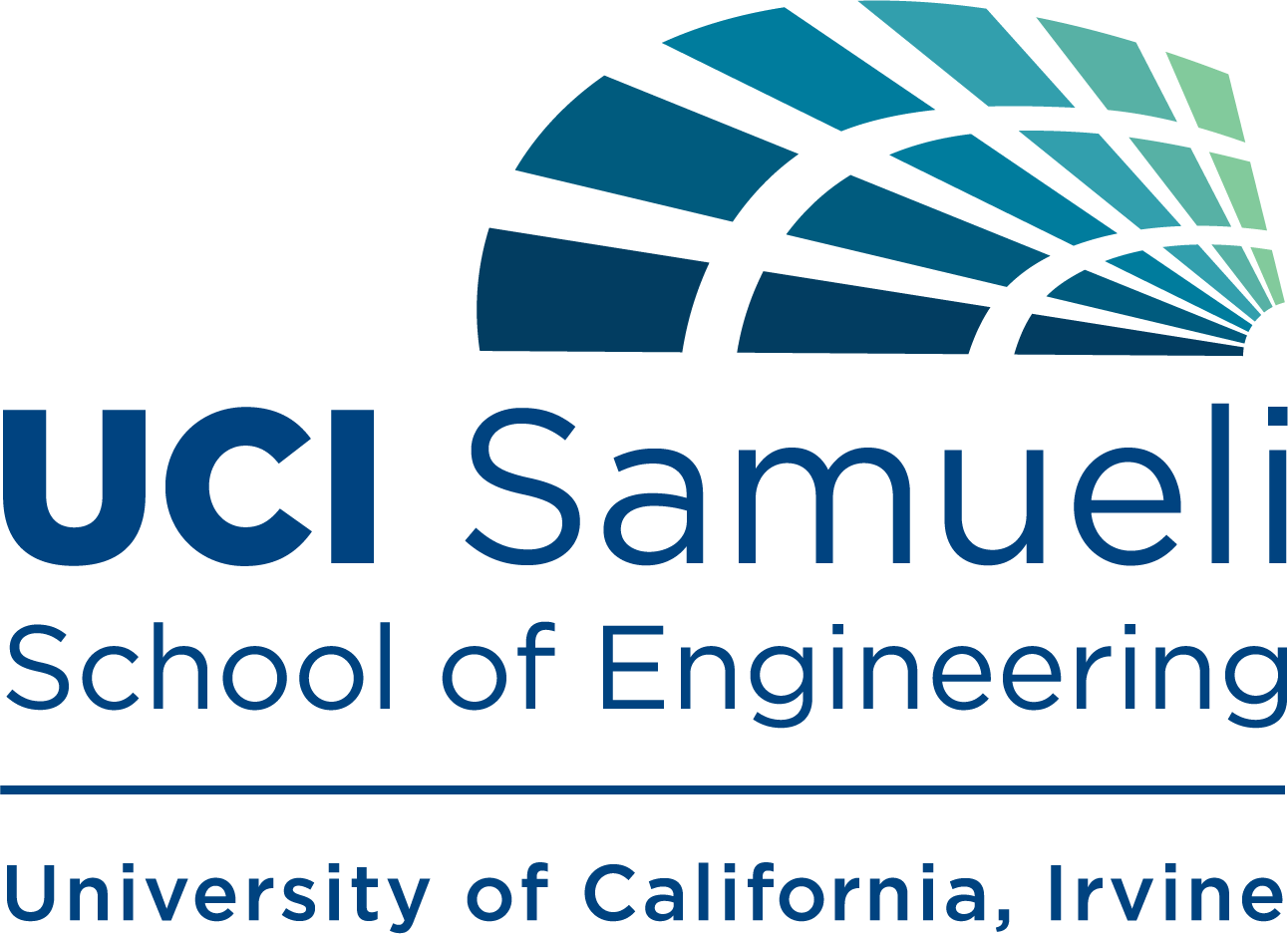

The UC Irvine Samueli School of Engineering (HSSoE) is the engineering school of the University of California, Irvine.

== History ==
In 2000, the engineering schools at UC Irvine and UCLA were renamed after Henry Samueli, co-founder of Irvine-based Broadcom Corporation. The renaming recognized his donations to the two schools in 1999: US$20 million to UC Irvine and US$30 million to UCLA.

Gregory Washington served as the dean of engineering from August 1, 2011 to July 1, 2020, when he resigned in order to accept appointment as President of George Mason University. Magnus Egerstedt took over as dean in July 2021.

== Departments ==
- Biomedical Engineering (BME)
- Chemical Engineering and Biomolecular Engineering (CBE)
- Civil and Environmental Engineering (CEE)
- Electrical Engineering and Computer Science (EECS)
- Mechanical and Aerospace Engineering (MAE)
- Materials Science and Engineering (MSE)

=== Degrees conferred ===
Each of the five departments confers Bachelor of Science, Master of Science, and Doctor of Philosophy degrees. The School of Engineering also offers a general B.S. degree in Engineering to upper-division students who wish to pursue an interdisciplinary program of study spanning more than one of the engineering departments, or a program not offered by one of the departments such as hydrology or project management.

The School of Engineering offers interdisciplinary degrees in conjunction with the Donald Bren School of Information and Computer Sciences: a B.S. in computer science and engineering, and M.S. and Ph.D. in Networked Systems.

Most, but not all, undergraduate degree programs are accredited by ABET. The first program to receive accreditation was Electrical Engineering in 1968; the most recent was Biomedical Engineering in 2008. Programs not accredited include two of the aforementioned interdisciplinary degrees (general Engineering, Networked Systems).

== Research centers ==
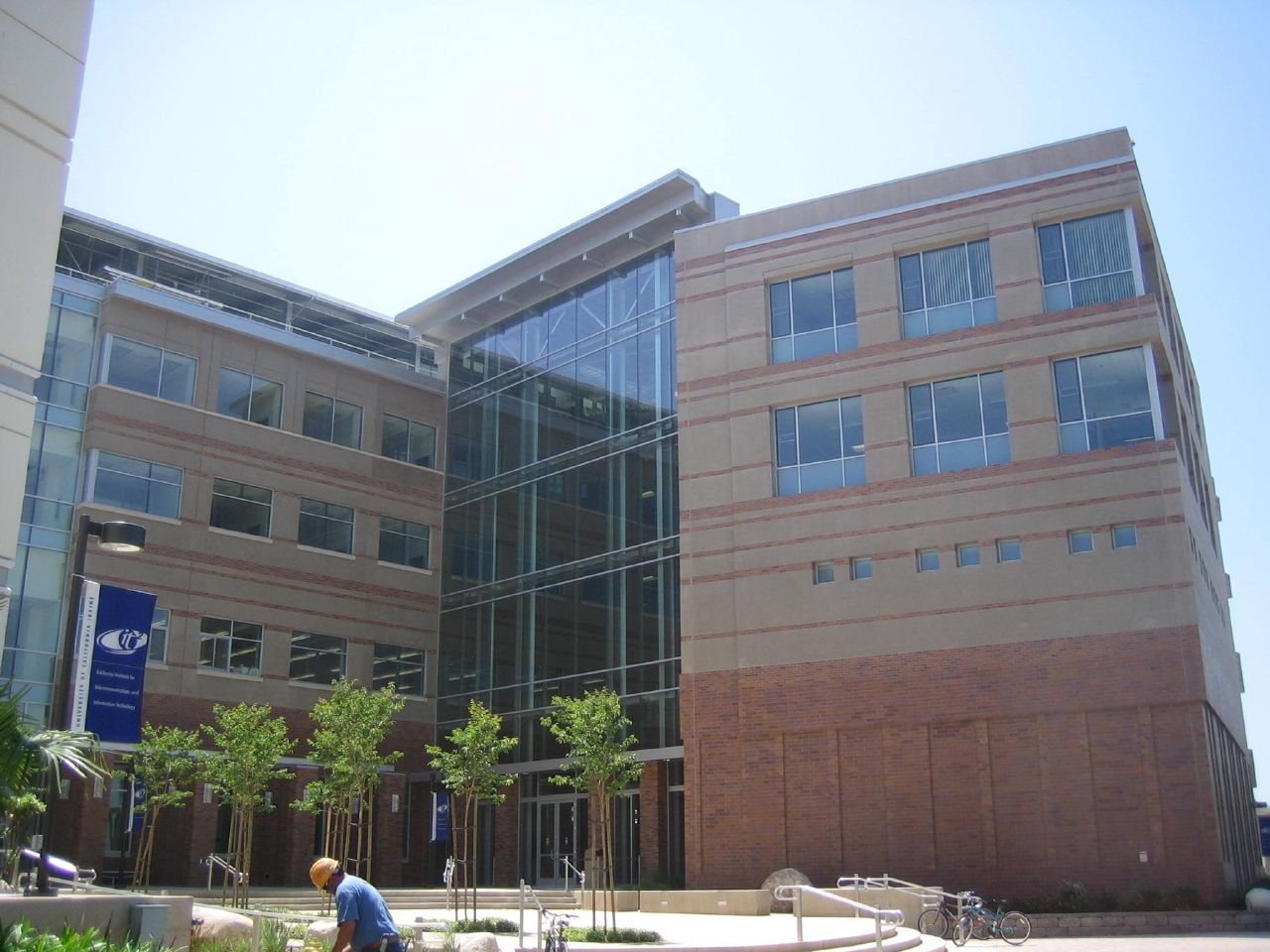
Calit2 building at UCI

In keeping with the University of California's primary mission as a research institution, all of the HSSoE's departments are involved in academic research. Additionally, HSSoE faculty and students are involved with several interdisciplinary research centers affiliated with UCI, other academic, research, or medical institutions, government agencies, and private industry. These research centers include:

- Advanced Power and Energy Program (APEP)
- Beckman Laser Institute
- California Institute for Telecommunications and Information Technology (Calit2)
- Carl Zeiss Center of Excellence for Electron Microscopy
- Center for Advanced Monitoring and Damage Inspection (CAMDI)
- Center for Biomedical Signal Processing and Computation (CBMSPC)
- Center for Embedded Computer Systems
- Center for Engineering Science in Design
- Center for Hydrometeorology and Remote Sensing (CHRS)
- Center for Pervasive Communications and Computing
- Chao Family Comprehensive Cancer Center
- The Edwards Lifesciences Center for Advanced Cardiovascular Technology
- Gavin Herbert Eye Institute
- Integrated Nanosystems Research Facility (INRF)
- Institute for Clinical and Translational Science (ICTS)
- Institute of Transportation Studies
- Lasers, Flames, and Aerosols Laboratory (LFA)
- Laboratory for Fluorescence Dynamics (LFD)
- LifeChips
- Materials Characterization Center (MC2)
- Micro/Nano Fluidics Fundamentals Focus Center (MF3)
- National Fuel Cell Research Center (NFCRC)
- Networked Systems Center
- RapidTech, National Center for Rapid Technologies
- Sue and Bill Gross Stem Cell Research Center
- UCI Combustion Laboratory
- Urban Water Research Center (UWRC)

== Facilities ==
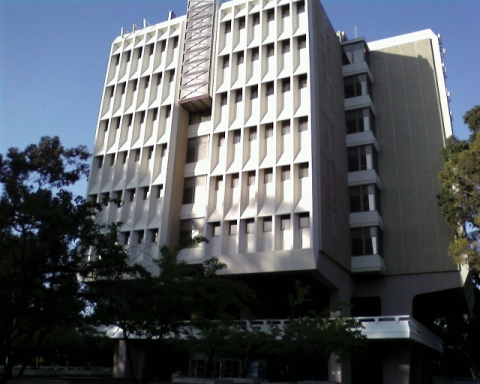
Engineering Tower is the tallest building on campus

Most of the school's facilities occupy one of the "spokes" of the UC Irvine campus' "Ring Road", its main 1-mile (1.6 km) circular pedestrian mall on which the university's academic schools (except for Arts, Business, and Medicine) are situated. This includes department offices, faculty offices, laboratories, classrooms and lecture halls, and a number of research facilities. Architecturally speaking, the school consists of a buildings ranging from brutalist to postmodern.

The brutalist Engineering Tower, designed by the Los Angeles firm Kistner, Wright & Wright and constructed in 1969-1970 during the campus' original building boom, is the tallest building on the main campus. It is noted for its cantilevered design which makes it nearly twice as wide at the top than at the base. Most of the remaining buildings, including the postmodern Engineering Gateway and flagship Calit2 facility, were built during the campus building boom that has lasted from the late 1980s until the present. The school also has portable classroom buildings that house classrooms, laboratories, and offices.

For many years Engineering shared some facilities with the Department of Information and Computer Science (ICS), including the Frank Gehry-designed ICS/Engineering Research Facility (IERF). However, following ICS' 2002 elevation to school status, as well as its 2004 endowment from Orange County real estate mogul Donald Bren, ICS moved many of its laboratories and offices out of shared space into the newly constructed Bren Hall located between Engineering and the Physical Sciences. IERF was demolished in 2007 and Engineering Hall was built in its place.

== Figures ==
Founded as the School of Engineering in 1965 with just two faculty members and 75 students declaring engineering majors; the school today serves more than 4,500 students (3,598 undergraduates and 951 graduates) enrolled in 12 undergraduate degree majors and 13 graduate degree programs. The school was renamed The Henry Samueli School of Engineering in 1999 after Samueli, co-founder, chairman and chief technical officer of Broadcom Inc., made a generous donation.

Private support from the community, alumni and corporations grew to $35.8 million in 2016–17. Gifts to the Samueli School help fund scholarships and fellowships for students, exciting research activities being conducted by faculty and graduate students, STEM outreach and critical academic programs.

== Notable faculty ==
- Satya N. Atluri, distinguished professor of Mechanical and Aerospace Engineering
- Michael W. Berns, professor of Biomedical Engineering
- Daniel Gajski, The Henry Samueli "Turing" Endowed Chair in Computer Systems Design, professor of electrical engineering and computer science
- Ahmed M. Eltawil, former professor of electrical engineering and computer science
- Payam Heydari, professor of electrical engineering and computer science
- Syed Ali Jafar, professor of electrical engineering and computer science
- Hamid Jafarkhani, professor of electrical engineering and computer science
- Michelle Khine, associate professor of Biomedical Engineering
- Robert H. Liebeck, adjunct professor of Mechanical and Aerospace Engineering
- Chang C. Liu, professor of Biomedical Engineering
- James H. Mulligan Jr., former dean and professor of Electrical Engineering
- Henry Samueli, adjunct professor of electrical engineering and computer science
- Soroosh Sorooshian, distinguished professor of Civil and Environmental Engineering and Earth System Science
- Lee Swindlehurst, professor of electrical engineering and computer science
- Bruce J. Tromberg, professor of Biomedical Engineering and of Surgery and Physiology and Biophysics (School of Medicine)
- Jasper A. Vrugt, assistant professor of Civil and Environmental Engineering
- H. Kumar Wickramasinghe, professor of electrical engineering and computer science

== See also ==
- Engineering education
