= Iconoclast (disambiguation) =

An iconoclast is one who professes iconoclasm (the belief in the importance of the destroying physical religious images); one who objects to the use of sacred images in religion, or who opposes orthodoxy and religion. Less formally, it can refer to a maverick who attacks traditional beliefs in any sphere.

Iconoclast(s) may also refer to:

== Film and television ==
- Iconoclasts (TV series), a 2005 Sundance Channel show
- Iconoclast, a 2011 documentary film about Boyd Rice
- Iconoclast (2026 film), a psychological thriller

== Music ==
- Iconoclast (band), since 1987, an American jazz duo

=== Albums ===
- Iconoclasts (album), 2025 studio album by Swedish musician Anna von Hausswolff
- Iconoclast trilogy, a series of three releases by German extreme metal band Heaven Shall Burn
  - Iconoclast, 2008 studio album
  - Iconoclast II -Bildersturm (The Visual Resistance)-, 2009 live CD/DVD
  - Invictus (Iconoclast III), 2010 studio album
- Iconoclast (Dope Knife album), 2014 album by Rap artist Dope Knife
- Iconoclast (Nazxul album), 2009 studio album by Nazxul, an Australian black metal band
- Iconoclast (Symphony X album), 2011 album by American progressive metal band Symphony X
- Iconoclast (EP), 2014 EP by Clinton Sparks

=== Songs ===
- "Iconoclast", a song on Emerson, Lake and Palmer's 1971 album Tarkus

== Other uses ==
- Iconoclasm, a pro wrestling move
- Iconoclast, c. 1853, a pen-name of the political activist and atheist Charles Bradlaugh
- Iconoclast: A Neuroscientist Reveals How to Think Differently, a book by Gregory Berns, published in 2008
- Iconoclasts (video game), 2018 platform game

== See also ==
- Ao-Iconoclast / Pigeon-The Green-ey'd Monster, 2009 maxi single by J-pop singer Kotoko
- Eikonoklastes, 1649 book by Milton
