= Samueli School of Engineering =

Samueli School of Engineering may refer to:

- UCLA Samueli School of Engineering, in Los Angeles, California
- UC Irvine Samueli School of Engineering, in Irvine, California
