= Henry L. Wright =

American architect (1904–1999)

- Born: February 28, 1904; San Diego
- Died: 1999
- Occupation: Architect

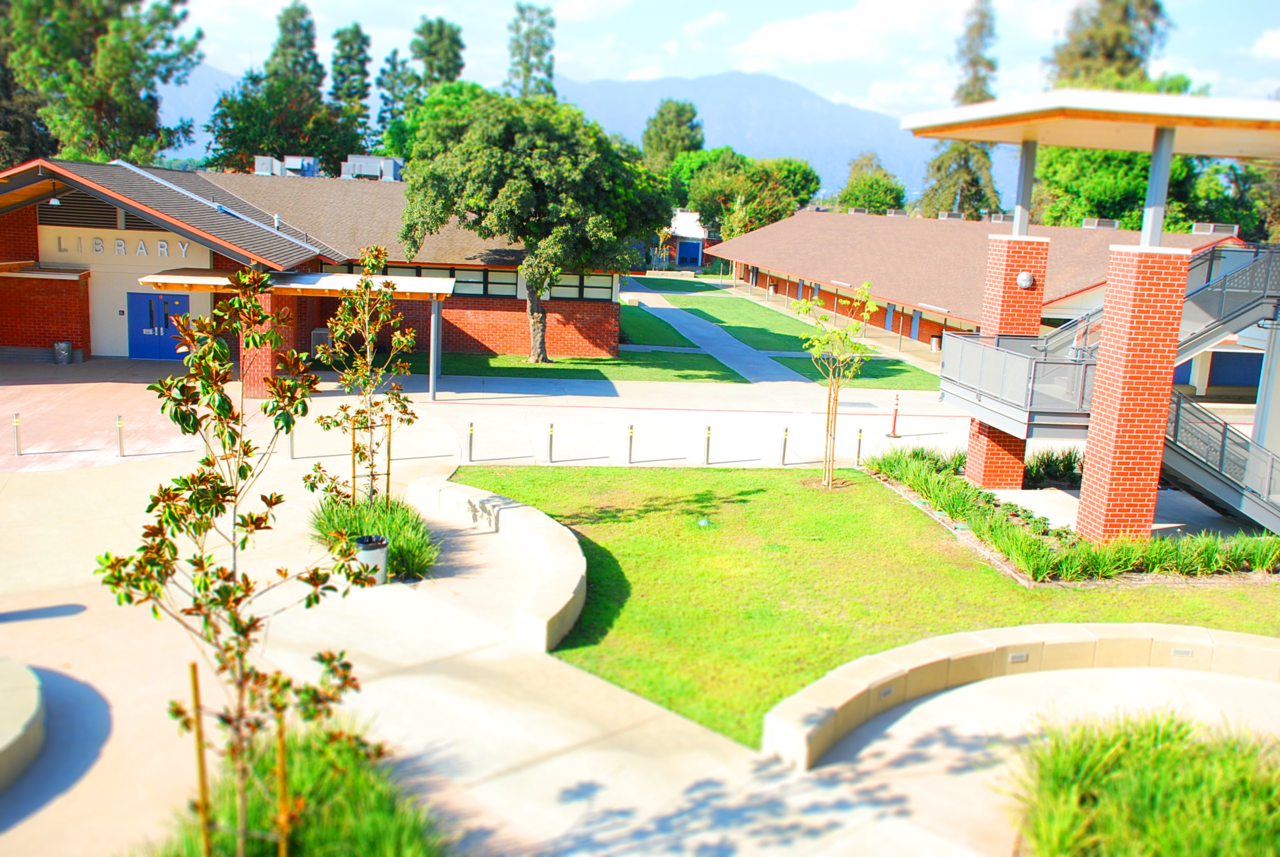
Arroyo High School in El Monte, completed in 1955.

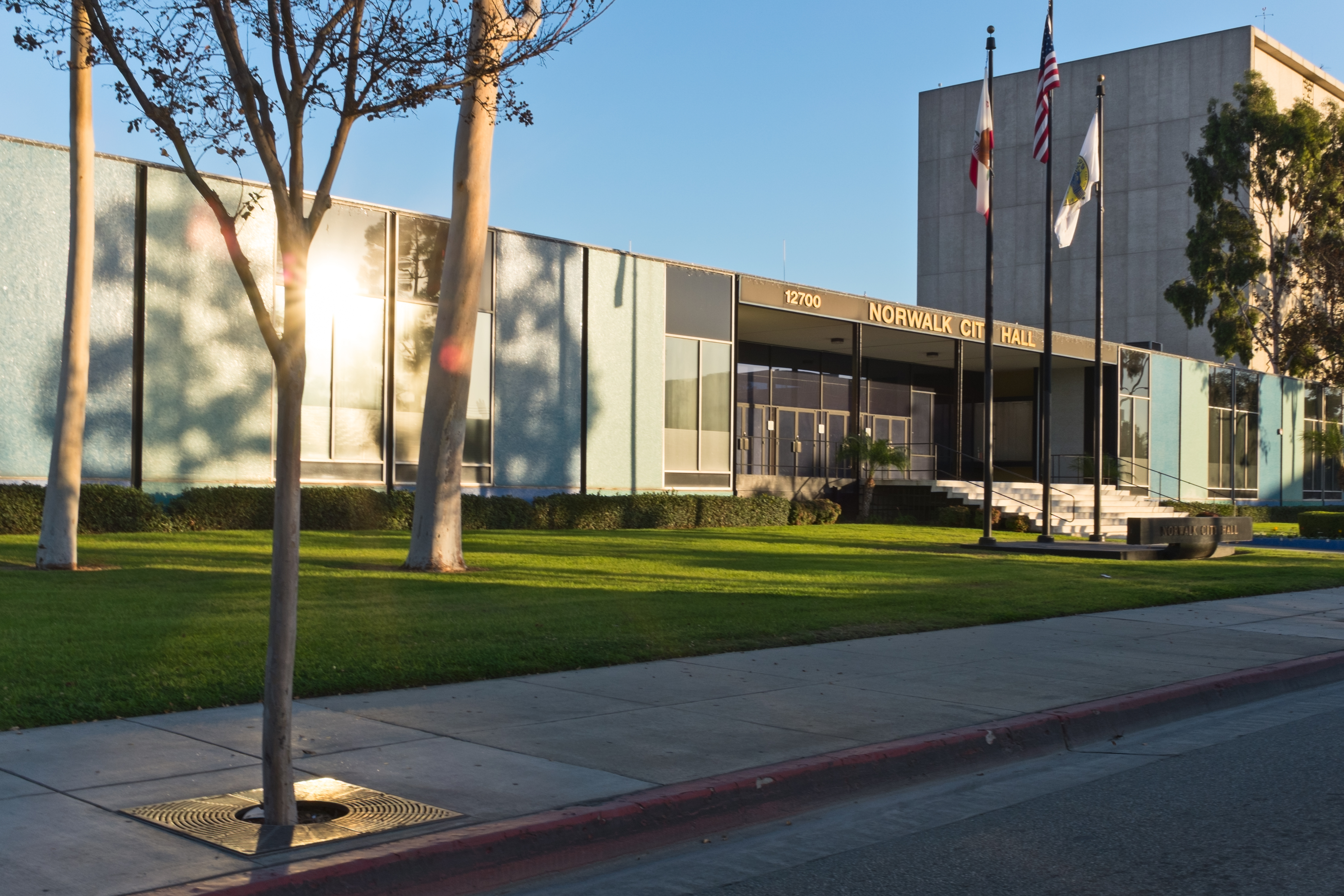
The City Hall of Norwalk, California, designed by Kistner, Wright & Wright and completed in 1965.

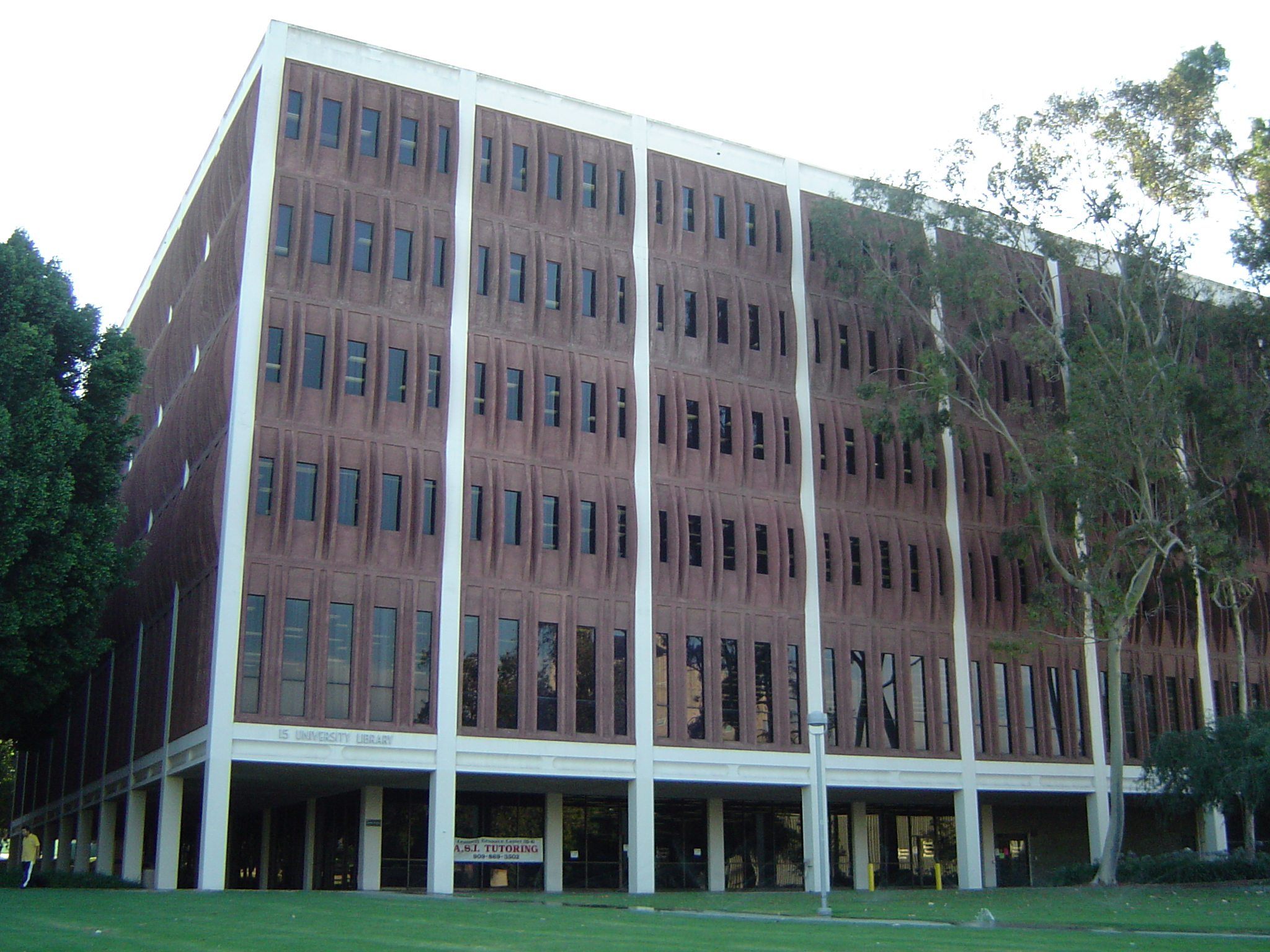
The Cal Poly Pomona University Library, completed in 1968.

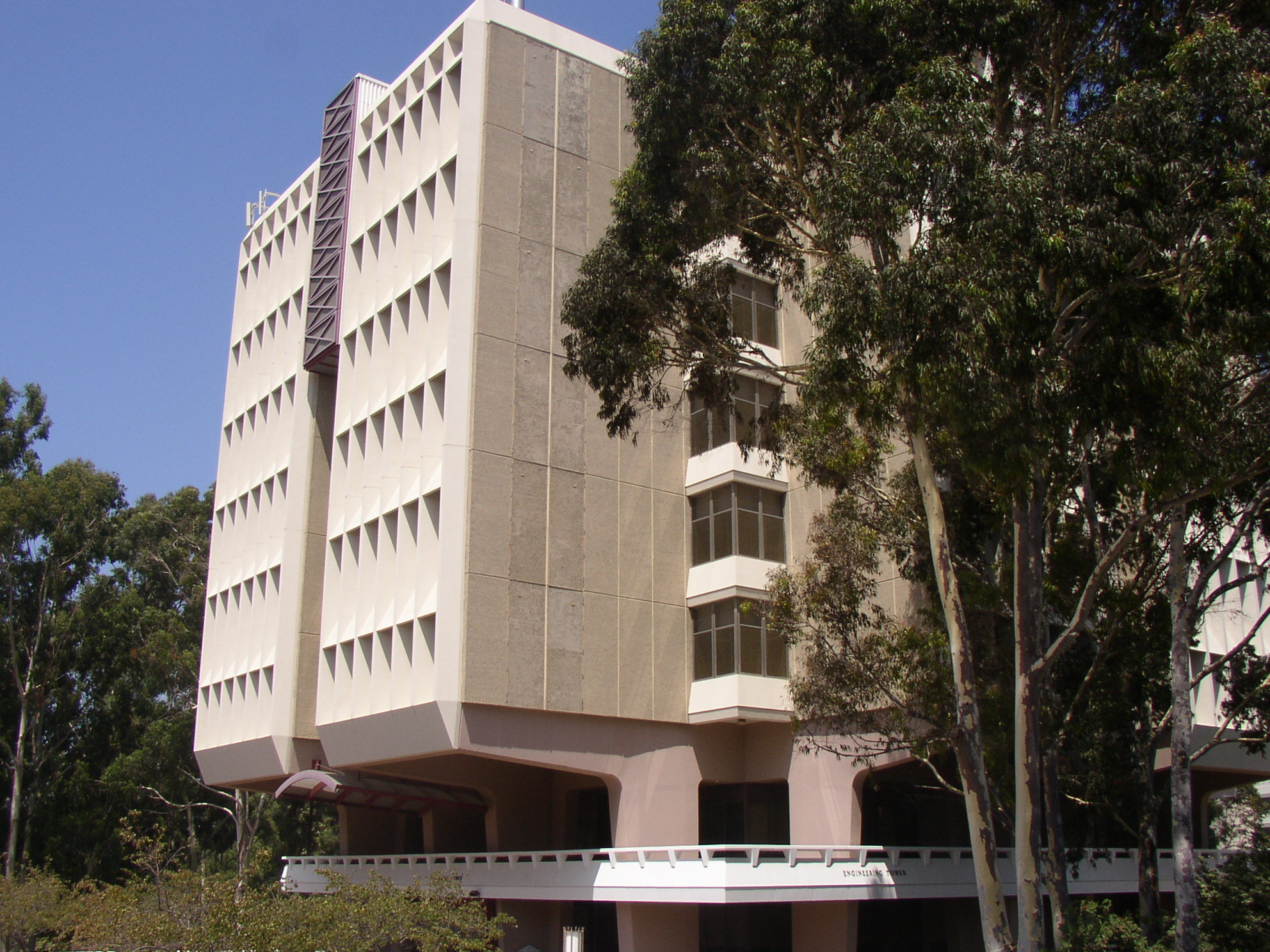
The Engineering Tower of University of California, Irvine, completed in 1970.

Henry L. Wright FAIA (1904–1999) was an American architect in practice in Los Angeles from 1941 to 1990. From 1962 to 1963 he was president of the American Institute of Architects.

== Life and career ==
Henry Lyman Wright was born February 28, 1904, in San Diego, where he was educated in the public schools. In 1922 he joined the office of local architect Theodore C. Kistner as a drafter, moving to Kistner's new Los Angeles office in 1923. While working he also attended the University of California, Los Angeles and the University of Southern California, graduating in 1929. In 1941 he became a partner in the firm, which became known as Kistner, Curtis & Wright. In 1952 the partnership was dissolved, with Kistner, Wright and his brother, engineer William T. Wright (1905–1979), remaining in Los Angeles as partners in the new firm of Kistner, Wright & Wright. Kistner retired in 1965 and died in 1973, and the Wright brothers continued the firm. With changes in the partnership, the name of the firm was changed to Kistner, Wright, Wright & Luley in 1981, back to Kistner, Wright & Wright in 1985 and finally to Kistner, Wright & Preston in 1990 before its dissolution in 1993. Wright and his associates were well known as architects of school and college buildings.

Wright joined the American Institute of Architects in 1943. He served on the organization's committee on school buildings from 1951 to 1957 and was its chair from 1954. In 1955 he was elected a Fellow. In 1962 he was elected to a single term as president of the organization. After his presidency he was elected to honorary membership in the Royal Architectural Institute of Canada, the Society of Architects of Mexico and the Philippine Institute of Architects.

Wright served as AIA representative to the White House Conference on Education in 1958 and the White House Conference on International Cooperation in 1965. In 1963 he was appointed to the United States National Commission for UNESCO and to the Public Advisory Panel on Architectural and Engineering Services of the General Services Administration in 1965.

== Legacy ==
Wright was heavily involved in many educational institutions and organizations. In 1960 the new Wright Intermediate School in Norwalk was named in his honor. It was later closed in 1978 and demolished in 1987.

== Personal life ==
Wright was married in 1934 to Virginia R. Pizzini, and they had two children. Wright died in 1999.

Wright joined the Jonathan Club in 1941.

== Architectural works ==
- Bellflower High School, 15301 McNab Ave, Bellflower, California (1950–51)
- Artesia High School, 12108 E Del Amo Blvd, Lakewood, California (1952–54)
- Arroyo High School, 4921 North Cedar Ave, El Monte, California (1954–55)
- Affiliated Teachers Organization of Los Angeles, 1125 W 6th St, Los Angeles, California (1955)
- Marine Corps Air Station El Toro, Irvine, California (1955)
- Marine Corps Air Station Miramar, San Diego, California (1955)
- Cerritos College, Cerritos, California (1959–61)
- IBM office building, 3610 14th St, Riverside, California (1960)
- World Cruise Terminal, (Note: As a joint venture with Edward H. Fickett.) 100 Swinford St, Los Angeles, California (1961–63)
- La Serna High School, 15301 Youngwood Dr, Whittier, California (1961)
- MiraCosta College, Oceanside, California (1964–65)
- Norwalk City Hall, 12700 Norwalk Blvd, Norwalk, California (1965)
- California Teachers Association building, 1111 W 6th St, Los Angeles, California (1967)
- Cal Poly Pomona University Library, California State Polytechnic University, Pomona, Pomona, California (1968)
- Engineering Tower, University of California, Irvine, Irvine, California (1969–70)
- College of Science, California State Polytechnic University, Pomona, Pomona, California (1973–76)
