= Gregory Berns =

American neuroscientist and writer (born 1964)

- Born: June 1964 (age 62)
- Other names: Gregory S. Berns; Greg Berns
- Education: Princeton University (BA); University of California, Davis (PhD); University of California, San Diego (MD)
- Occupations: Neuroeconomist, neuroscientist, psychiatrist and writer
- Spouse: Kathleen Berns
- Relatives: Michael W. Berns (father)
- Scientific career
- Fields: Neuroeconomics, psychiatry and psychology
- Workplaces: Emory University
- Website: www.ccnl.emory.edu/greg/

Gregory Scott Berns (born June 1964) is an American neuroeconomist, neuroscientist, professor of psychiatry, and psychologist. He lives with his family in Atlanta, Georgia, US.

Berns holds the Distinguished Chair of Neuroeconomics in the Department of Psychiatry and Behavioral Sciences, Emory University School of Medicine in Atlanta where he is a professor of both psychiatry and economics. He is the director of the Center for Neuropolicy; the author of the books Satisfaction: The Science of Finding True Fulfillment, Iconoclast: A Neuroscientist Reveals How to Think Differently, How Dogs Love Us: A Neuroscientist and His Adopted Dog Decode the Canine Brain; and has made numerous media appearances.

== Life and career ==
=== Education ===
Berns graduated with an A.B. in physics from Princeton University in 1986 after completing a senior thesis titled "The measurement of force distributions in the foot during running." In 1990 he went on to study for a Ph.D. in Biomechanical engineering, and then for an M.D. Medicine in 1994, both at the University of California.

After graduating, Berns was a Research Assistant / Postdoctoral Fellow at Salk Institute for Biological Studies from 1990 to 1994; had a General Psychiatry and Medicine Internship at University of Pittsburgh Medical Center's Western Psychiatric Institute and Clinic from 1994 to 1995, followed by an Adult Psychiatry Residency there from 1995 to 1998.

=== Authorship ===
To date, Berns has written three books. In his first book Satisfaction: the science of finding true fulfillment, published in 2005, Berns challenges the theory that people are driven to pursue pleasure and avoid pain (see pleasure principle, for example). He argues instead that true satisfaction comes from novel experiences which are undergone in the process of achieving an aim, rather than the achievement itself, and this involves an active striving rather than a "passive feeling of happiness."

Berns' second book Iconoclast: A Neuroscientist Reveals How to Think Differently continues the theme developed in Satisfaction and the exploration of the neurological bases of human creativity. It describes and investigates iconoclasts: innovative and creative people who break with the established, traditional way of thinking or of doing things; 'break' cultural icons, and manage to do what others say cannot be done. The work profiles a number of famous 'free-thinkers' such as Warren Buffett; Dale Chihuly; the Dixie Chicks; Richard Feynman; Henry Ford; Steve Jobs; Martin Luther King Jr. and Picasso.

Berns argues that iconoclasts manage to break through three major 'mental roadblocks' which he enumerates as (a) perception (often having insights triggered through visual imagery); (b) the human fear response (fear of failure, of the unknown, and of ridicule), and (c) social skills, social intelligence and social networking abilities. Berns' work is mainly interested in successful iconoclasts, not with those who show such innovation in their 'log cabin in the woods' but do not go on to market the idea.

His third book, How Dogs Love Us: A Neuroscientist and His Adopted Dog Decode the Canine Brain, was published in October 2013. The book describes Berns' efforts to train dogs to voluntarily undergo functional magnetic resonance imaging (fMRI). Because MRI machines are loud and require subjects to remain still during scans, prior to Berns' work, all brain imaging conducted on living dogs was performed with the animals under sedation. The book details the techniques that Berns and his team developed to train and test two dogs, including Berns' feist Callie, to undergo the imaging procedure. It also describes a study that the team conducted using this method, which observed increases in caudate activity in response to hand signals associated with food rewards. A later study replicated the procedure and results in a larger sample of dogs, and further supported the reliability of the technique.

== Reception ==
=== Books ===
==== Satisfaction ====
Berns' book Satisfaction was reviewed by Jonathan Beard in the December 2005 edition of the Scientific American Mind magazine.

Writing in CNN Money's Fortune magazine, John Simons sums up the main thrust of Satisfaction by quoting Berns: "The sense of satisfaction after you've successfully handled unexpected tasks or sought out unfamiliar, physically and emotionally demanding activities is your brain's signal that you're doing what nature designed you to do." Though the reviewer found that Berns can be "somewhat professorial, Satisfaction is no plodding textbook". He noted that "nothing escapes the author's investigative eye" and concluded that "Berns's gumshoe approach to scientific theory offers its own proof that a fresh take on the familiar can be most gratifying".

==== Iconoclast ====
Writing in the Winter 2009 edition of Stanford Social Innovation Review and reviewing Iconoclast, Robert J. Sternberg points to the three major mental roadblocks that people need to overcome if they wish to be iconoclasts. "First, see things differently from other people—see what others do not see. Second, conquer your fear of failure, of the unknown, and of ridicule. Third, be socially intelligent: Figure out how to interest people in your ideas and how to sell those ideas to opinion leaders." Sternburg also points out that iconoclasts' brains are wired differently. For example, the amygdala, situated within the medial temporal lobes of the brain, of the iconoclast tends to reduce their emotional reactions and fear response.

Sternberg is of the opinion that Berns gives insufficient credit to the role played by intelligence; analytical thinking; and several aspects of creative thinking, particularly conformity arising from family and cultural background. Sternberg also feels that the author gives undue emphasis to the faculty of sight in the innovative iconoclastic process. The reviewer objects to Berns' contention that "imagination comes from the visual system", pointing out that blind people can be creative (e.g. the author and political activist Helen Keller) and that other senses may be used creatively (e.g. the composer Mozart).

Overall, however, Sternberg concludes that Iconoclast is "a technically sound and inspiring book". The reviewer writes that Iconoclast "not only analyzes the nature of iconoclasm in fascinating detail, but also serves as a guide for people who feel trapped by conventional thinking and want to escape. The keys out of their prisons are in this book. It is up to these readers to use them to escape and open new doors."

=== Academic honours and awards ===
Berns has won numerous academic awards during his career:

- Princeton University Department of Physics: Allen G. Shenstone Prize for Outstanding Work in Experimental Physics, 1986
- University of California, Davis: University of California Regents' Fellowship, 1989–90
- American Society of Biomechanics: Postdoctoral Young Scientist Award, 1991
- Western Psychiatric Institute and Clinic, Pittsburgh, PA: Thomas Detre Prize for Outstanding Medical Student Paper in General Psychiatry, 1993
- American Psychiatric Association: APA/Lilly Resident Research Award, 1995–96
- National Institute of Mental Health: NIMH Outstanding Resident Award, 1996
- Society of Biological Psychiatry: SOBP/Lilly Fellowship Award, 1997
- Organon: Excellence in Psychiatry Residency Award, 1998
- Anxiety Disorders Association of America: Senior Travel Award, 1999
- American Psychiatric Association: APA/SmithKline Beecham Young Faculty Award, 1999
- Emory University School of Medicine: Dean's Clinical Investigator Award, 2001–2004
- World Economic Forum: Forum Fellow, 2004, 2009

== Works published ==
=== Books ===
- Berns, Gregory (2005). Satisfaction: The Science of Finding True Fulfillment. Henry Holt and Company. ISBN 978-0-8050-7600-4. OL 3420520M.
- Berns, Gregory (2008). Iconoclast: A Neuroscientist Reveals How to Think Differently. Harvard Business School Press. ISBN 978-1-4221-1501-5. OL 16474656M.
- Berns, Gregory (2013). How Dogs Love Us: A Neuroscientist and His Adopted Dog Decode the Canine Brain. New Harvest. ISBN 978-0-544-11451-7. OL 26179492M.
- Berns, Gregory (2017). What It's Like to Be a Dog: And Other Adventures in Animal Neuroscience. Basic Books. ISBN 978-0-465-09624-4. OL 26928471M.
- Berns, Gregory (2022). The Self Delusion: The New Neuroscience of How We Invent—and Reinvent—Our Identities. Basic Books. ISBN 978-1-5416-0229-8. OL 38058948M.

=== Research articles ===
Berns' and the work of his colleagues has been featured in many academic and specialist journals:

- Berns, MW; Aist, J; Edwards, J; Strahs, K; Girton, J; McNeill, P; Rattner, JB; Kitzes, M; Hammer-Wilson, M; Liaw, L-H; Siemens, A; Koonce, M; Peterson, S; Brenner, S; Burt, J; Walter, R; Bryant, PJ; van Dyk, D; Coulombe, J; Cahill, T; Berns, GS (1981). "Laser microsurgery in cell and developmental biology" (PDF). Science. 213 (4507): 505–513. Bibcode:1981Sci...213..505B. doi:10.1126/science.7017933. PMID 7017933. S2CID 20146961.
- Berns, GS; Berns, MW (1982). "Computer-based tracking of living cells". Exp. Cell Res. 142: 103–109. doi:10.1016/0014-4827(82)90414-1. PMID 6754398. S2CID 37539813.
- Berns, MW; Berns, GS; Coffey, J; Wile, AG (1984). "Exposure (dose) tables for hematoporphyrin derivative photoradiation therapy". Lasers in Surgery and Medicine. 4 (1): 107–131. doi:10.1002/lsm.1900040115. PMID 6235411. S2CID 46559135.
- Berns, GS; Hull, ML; Patterson, HA (1990). "Implementation of a five degree of freedom automated system to determine knee flexibility in vitro". Journal of Biomechanical Engineering. 112 (4): 392–400. doi:10.1115/1.2891202. PMID 2273865.
- Howell, SM; Berns, GS; Farley, TE (1991). "Unimpinged and impinged anterior cruciate ligament grafts: MR signal intensity measurements". Radiology. 179 (3): 639–643. doi:10.1148/radiology.179.3.2027966. PMID 2027966.
- Berns, GS; Hull, ML; Patterson, HA (1992). "Strain in the anteromedial bundle of the anterior cruciate ligament under combination loading". J. Orthop. Res. 10 (2): 167–176. doi:10.1002/jor.1100100203. PMID 1740734. S2CID 24309312.
- Berns, GS; Howell, SM; Farley, TE (1992). "The accuracy of signal intensity measurements in magnetic resonance imaging as evaluated within the knee". Magn. Reson. Imaging. 10 (4): 573–578. doi:10.1016/0730-725x(92)90008-n. PMID 1501527.
- Berns, GS; Howell, SM (1993). "Roofplasty requirements in vitro for different tibial hole placements in anterior cruciate ligament reconstructions". Am. J. Sports Med. 21 (2): 292–298. doi:10.1177/036354659302100221. PMID 8465927. S2CID 36262257.
- Berns, GS; Dayan, P; Sejnowski, TJ (1993). "A correlational model for the development of disparity selectivity in visual cortex that depends on prenatal and postnatal phases". Proc. Natl. Acad. Sci. USA. 90 (17): 8277–8281. Bibcode:1993PNAS...90.8277B. doi:10.1073/pnas.90.17.8277. PMC 47332. PMID 8367493.
- Hull, ML; Berns, GS; Varma, H; Patterson, HA (1996). "1996 Strain in the medial collateral ligament of the human knee under single and combined loads". J. Biomech. 29 (2): 199–206. doi:10.1016/0021-9290(95)00046-1. PMID 8849813.
- Berns, GS; Cohen, JD; Mintun, MA (1997). "Brain regions responsive to novelty in the absence of awareness". Science. 276 (5316): 1272–1275. doi:10.1126/science.276.5316.1272. PMID 9157889.
- Berns, GS; Sejnowski, TJ (1998). "A computational model of how the basal ganglia produce sequences". J. Cogn. Neurosci. 10 (1): 108–121. doi:10.1162/089892998563815. PMID 9526086. S2CID 1579309.
- Nemeroff, CB; Kilts, CD; Berns, GS (1999). "Functional brain imaging: Twenty-first century phrenology or psychobiological advance for the millennium?". Am. J. Psychiatry. 156 (5): 671–673. doi:10.1176/ajp.156.5.671. PMID 10327896. S2CID 10243537.
- Berns, GS; Song, AW; Mao, H (1999). "Continuous functional magnetic resonance imaging reveals dynamic nonlinearities in "dose-response" curves for finger opposition". J. Neurosci. 19 (14): 1–6. doi:10.1523/JNEUROSCI.19-14-j0003.1999. PMC 6783069. PMID 10407059.
- Bischoff-Grethe, A; Proper, SM; Mao, H; Daniels, KA; Berns, GS (2000). "2000 Conscious and unconscious processing of nonverbal predictability in Wernicke's area". J. Neurosci. 20 (5): 1975–1981. doi:10.1523/JNEUROSCI.20-05-01975.2000. PMC 6772930. PMID 10684898.
- Berns, GS; McClure, SM; Pagnoni, G; Montague, PR (2001). "Predictability modulates human brain response to reward". J. Neurosci. 21 (8): 2793–2798. doi:10.1523/JNEUROSCI.21-08-02793.2001. PMC 6762527. PMID 11306631.
- Bischoff-Grethe, A; Martin, M; Mao, H; Berns, GS (2001). "The context of uncertainty modulates the subcortical response to predictability". J. Cogn. Neurosci. 13 (7): 986–993. doi:10.1162/089892901753165881. PMID 11595100. S2CID 11950576.
- Berns, GS; Martin, M; Proper, S (2002). "Limbic hyperreactivity in bipolar II disorder". Am. J. Psychiatry. 159 (304–306): 304–6. doi:10.1176/appi.ajp.159.2.304. PMID 11823276.
- Pagnoni G, Zink CF, Montague PR, Berns GS: Activity in human ventral striatum locked to errors of reward prediction. Nat. Neurosci., 5:97-98, 2002. PDF.
- Dhamala M, Pagnoni G, Wiesenfeld K, Berns GS: Measurements of brain activity complexity for varying mental loads. Phys. Rev. E., 65:041917(7), 2002.
- Rilling JK, Gutman DA, Zeh TR, Pagnoni G, Berns GS, Kilts CD: A neural basis for social cooperation. Neuron, 35:395-405, 2002. PDF.
- Montague, PR; Berns, GS; Cohen, JD; McClure, SM; Pagnoni, G; Dhamala, M; Wiest, M; Karpov, I; King, RD; Apple, N; Fisher, RE (2002). "Hyperscanning: Simultaneous fMRI during linked social interactions". NeuroImage. 16 (4): 1159–1164. doi:10.1006/nimg.2002.1150. hdl:11380/609275. PMID 12202103. S2CID 15988039.
- McClure SM, Berns GS, Montague PR: Temporal prediction errors in a passive learning task activate human striatum. Neuron 38: 339–346, 2003. PDF.
- Dhamala, M; Pagnoni, G; Wiesenfeld, K; Zink, CF; Martin, M; Berns, GS (2003). "Neural correlates of the complexity of rhythmic finger tapping". NeuroImage. 20 (2): 918–926. doi:10.1016/s1053-8119(03)00304-5. hdl:11380/609279. PMID 14568462. S2CID 14395641.
- Zink CF, Pagnoni G, Martin ME, Dhamala M, Berns GS: Human striatal response to salient non-rewarding stimuli. J. Neurosci. 23:8092-8097, 2003. PDF. Accompanying editorial.
- Zink CF, Pagnoni G, Martin-Skurski ME, Chappelow JC, Berns GS: Human striatal response to monetary reward depends on saliency. Neuron 42:509-517, 2004. PDF.
- Capuron L, Pagnoni G, Demetrashvili M, Woolwine BJ, Nemeroff CB, Berns GS, Miller AH: Anterior cingulate activation and error processing during interferon-alpha treatment. Biol. Psychiatry 58:190-196, 2005. PDF.
- Berns GS, Chappelow JC, Zink CF, Pagnoni G, Martin-Skurski ME, Richards R: Neurobiological correlates of social conformity and independence during mental rotation. Biol. Psychiatry 58:245-253, 2005. PDF.
- Zink CF, Pagnoni G, Chappelow JC, Martin-Skurski ME, Berns GS: Human striatal activation reflects degree of stimulus saliency. Neuroimage 29:977-983, 2006. PDF.
- Berns GS, Chappelow J, Cekic M, Zink CF, Pagnoni G, Martin-Skurski ME: Neurobiologic substrates of dread. Science, 312:754-758, 2006. PDF. Supporting Materials.
- Capuron L, Pagnoni G, Demetrashvili MF, Lawson DH, Fornwalt FB, Woolwine B, Berns GS, Nemeroff CB, Miller AH: Basal ganglia hypermetabolism and symptoms of fatigue during interferon-alpha therapy. Neuropsychopharmacology 32:2394-2392, 2007.
- Berns GS, Capra CM, Moore S, Noussair C: A shocking experiment: new evidence on probability weighting and common ratio violations. Judgment & Decision Making 2:234-242, 2007. PDF.
- Chandrasekhar PVS, Capra CM, Moore S, Noussair C, Berns GS: Neurobiological regret and rejoice functions for aversive outcomes. Neuroimage 39:1472-1484 (epub Nov 2007). PDF.
- Berns GS, Capra CM, Chappelow J, Moore S, Noussair C: Nonlinear neurobiological probability weighting functions for aversive outcomes. Neuroimage 39:2047-2057, 2008 (epub Nov 2007). PDF.
- Engelmann, JB; Capra, CM; Noussair, C; Berns, GS (2009). "Expert financial advice neurobiologically "offloads" financial decision-making under risk". PLoS ONE. 4 (3) e4957. Bibcode:2009PLoSO...4.4957E. doi:10.1371/journal.pone.0004957. PMC 2655712. PMID 19308261.
- Berns, GS; Moore, S; Capra, CM (2009). "2009 Adolescent engagement in dangerous behaviors is associated with increased white matter maturity of frontal cortex". PLOS ONE. 4 (8) e6773. doi:10.1371/journal.pone.0006773. PMC 2728774. PMID 19707512.
- Berns, GS; Capra, CM; Moore, S; Noussair, C (2010). "Neural mechanisms of the influence of popularity on adolescent ratings of music". NeuroImage. 49 (3): 2687–2696. doi:10.1016/j.neuroimage.2009.10.070. PMC 2818406. PMID 19879365.
- Berns, Gregory S.; Brooks, Andrew M.; Spivak, Mark; Neuhauss, Stephan C. F. (11 May 2012). "Functional MRI in Awake Unrestrained Dogs". PLOS ONE. 7 (5) e38027. Bibcode:2012PLoSO...738027B. doi:10.1371/journal.pone.0038027. PMC 3350478. PMID 22606363.

=== Lectures ===
- Staff (29 October 2008). "Authors@Google: Dr. Gregory Berns talks" (video). AtGoogleTalks.

=== Interviews, appearances and media coverage ===
- Fox, Maggie (30 September 2008). "Herd mentality rules in financial crisis". Reuters.
- Graham, Danielle (April–May 2009). "Iconoclasts and Innovation Addressing Fears That Prevent Creativity". SuperConsciousness Magazine. Archived from the original on 2010-08-06.
- Grech, Dan (16 November 2009). "Your Mind and Your Money – Extended Interview with Gregory Berns". Public Broadcasting Service. Archived from the original (video) on April 15, 2011.
- Keough, Dr. Kevin (1 October 2008). "Iconoclast". Psychjourney. Archived from the original (Podcast) on 9 January 2011.
- Staff (13 January 2006). "Dr. Greg Berns Answers Viewers' Questions on Conformity". ABC News Primetime.
- Staff. "Dr. Greg Berns: Looking at the Teenage Brain". United States Department of Health and Human Services, National Institutes of Health. Archived from the original on 2010-05-27.
- Watt, Stephen (Spring 2009). "Iconoclasts: Great Minds Think Different (interview in Rotman Magazine)" (PDF). Desautels Centre for Integrative Thinking, Rotman School of Management, University of Toronto. Archived from the original (PDF) on 2010-09-22.

== See also ==
- Behavioural sciences
- Motivation
- Pleasure
- Pleasure principle
- Hyperscanning
