= Roderic I. Pettigrew =

American medical imaging scientist and physician

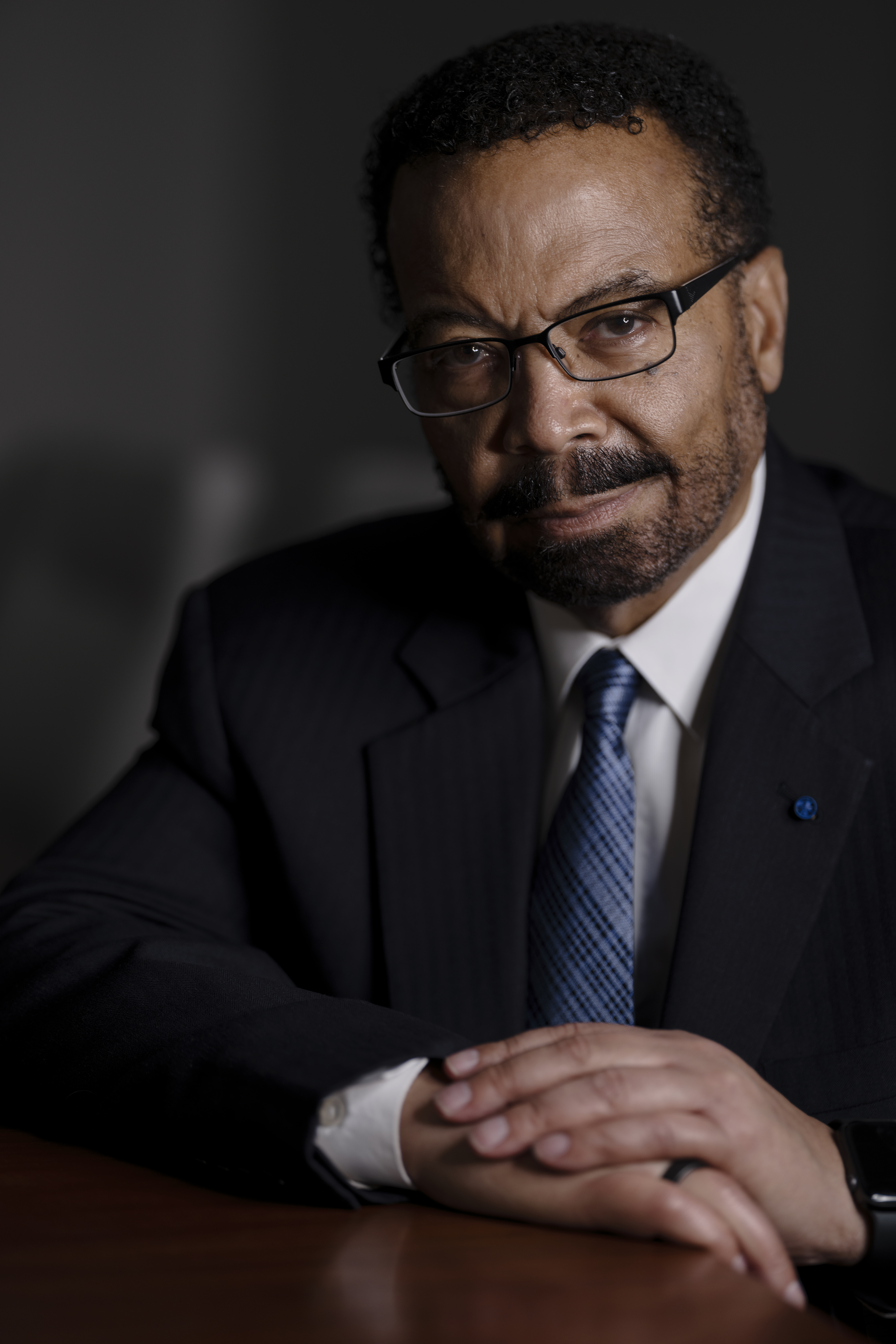
- Pettigrew in 2022

Professor, Texas A&M University
- Incumbent
- Assumed office November 2017

Founding Director, NIBIB
- In office 2002–2017

Personal details
- Born: Roderic I. Pettigrew Georgia, U.S.
- Education: Morehouse College; RPI; MIT; UMMSM

Roderic Ivan Pettigrew is an American physicist, engineer, and physician who is the former Executive Dean for EnMed at Texas A&M University. From 2002-November 2017, he was the founding director of the National Institute of Biomedical Imaging and Bioengineering (NIBIB) at the National Institutes of Health (NIH). He is a pioneer and world expert in cardiovascular magnetic resonance imaging (MRI).

== Early life and education ==
Pettigrew was born in Georgia, the second of three children. He spent his pre-college years in Albany, Georgia in the 1960s, during the peak of the civil rights movement. His primary education was in a segregated school system, during the period that overlapped with passage and enactment of the Civil Rights Act of 1964.

Following 11th grade and without graduating from high school, Pettigrew accepted an early admission scholarship from Charles E. Merrill, Jr., to attend Morehouse College in Atlanta, Georgia. While majoring in physics he also studied philosophy, art, and German at the Institute of European Studies for a year in Vienna, Austria, through a second Merrill scholarship. He received a Bachelor of Science degree in physics from Morehouse in 1972.

Pettigrew then attended Rensselaer Polytechnic Institute (RPI) which had begun a new program in medical physics, and in 1973 he received a Master of Science degree in nuclear science and engineering. He subsequently pursued a unique research program in applying nuclear engineering to medical problems at the Massachusetts Institute of Technology (MIT), which culminated in 1977 with a Ph.D. in applied radiation physics from the Department of Nuclear Engineering. There he was a Harvard-MIT Health Sciences and Technology Whitaker Fellow, where he helped research the application of boron-neutron capture therapy for malignant brain tumors. In 1979, Pettigrew received his M.D. from the Miller School of Medicine at the University of Miami in a then-novel program which only admitted students who already held a Ph.D. in a science field. This accelerated program over 24 consecutive months aimed to train physician-scientists who would bring new perspectives to meeting healthcare challenges.

Pettigrew completed a medical internship and residency in internal medicine at Emory University Affiliated Hospitals and in 1983 completed a residency in nuclear medicine at the University of California San Diego. There he began work on single-photon emission computed tomography and non-invasive cardiac imaging.

== Research career ==
In 1983, Pettigrew undertook a position as clinical research scientist at Picker International, Inc., where he began work in developing nuclear magnetic resonance imaging, later called MRI, specifically for the heart. Picker was the first company to manufacture an MRI scanner, and Pettigrew helped develop their technology for cardiovascular imaging. Of the first 10 Picker MRI scanners installed worldwide, Pettigrew co-developed, along with A.V. Lakshminarayanan, and installed the cardiac imaging software on all of these systems. These included the first units at the Mayo Clinic, Wake Forrest University, and the NIH Clinical Center and several systems in Europe.

In 1984, Pettigrew received a fellowship from the Robert Wood Johnson Foundation (RWJF) in their Harold Amos Medical Faculty Development Program, created to help achieve more appropriate representation and inclusion of minority scientists and scholars in academia. As an RWJF fellow, he moved to Emory University School of Medicine in the Department of Radiology and continued his work in developing non-invasive cardiovascular imaging employing nuclear medicine and MRI. At Emory, he partnered with scientists at Philips Medical Systems to develop the first industrial cardiovascular MRI software package (Philips Cardiac Package, 1988). In 1989, when the Radiological Society of North America (RSNA) held its Diamond Jubilee 75th Anniversary meeting, then hailed as the largest medical meeting in the world, Pettigrew delivered the invited keynote, the Eugene Pendergrass New Horizons Lecture. This talk, titled Four Dimensional Cardiac MRI: Diagnostic Procedure of the Future, predicted the advanced medial technological approach being realized and built upon today.

In the 1990s, through appointments as professor in the Department of Cardiology at the Emory University School of Medicine, where he directed the Emory Center for Magnetic Resonance Research, and in the Department of Bioengineering at the Georgia Institute of Technology, his research continued to focus on applying MRI to the diagnosis of a variety of cardiac disorders, quantifying heart-wall function, imaging coronary arteries, and in quantifying blood flow across heart valves and in vessels, including congenital heart anomalies.

== Transition to NIH ==
In 2002, Pettigrew was named the first director of NIBIB, after contentious and prolonged effort by the national medical imaging and bioengineering communities to establish an NIH institute that is dedicated to advancing health through these catalytic fields, known to be engines of scientific progress. Of historical note is that Congress passed the bill to establish NIBIB (the National Institute of Biomedical Imaging and Bioengineering Establishment Act) just before Christmas recess in 2000, and President Bill Clinton signed it into law as the last legislative act of his presidency.

== NIBIB: 2002-2007 ==
Under Pettigrew's direction, NIBIB achieved rapid scientific growth and influence. The initial federal appropriation doubled and applications quadrupled from year 1 to year 2, bringing a new community of physical scientists and engineers into the NIH community. More than half of these applications were from investigators new to NIH. NIBIB partnered with the Howard Hughes Medical Institute led by Thomas Cech to train the next generation of medical researchers at the interface of the physical and life sciences and engineering.

Pettigrew also conceived the NIBIB Quantum Grants Program, designed to target major medical problems that would be transformative for health care and could be solved by technological innovation over a decade. In remarks made in 2007, Pettigrew called the Quantum Program awards "Medical Moonshots," an analogy to President Kennedy's 1961 challenge to land a man on the moon before the end of the decade.

== NIBIB: 2008-2013 ==
Pettigrew and NIBIB continued to lead technological innovation with a variety of creative national and international programs, including an effort to reduce the radiation dose patients receive in routine computed tomography (CT), building a national network to develop and deploy point-of-care diagnostic technologies, and establishing two joint programs with the government of India. NIBIB expanded its reach through the DEBUT Prize for undergraduate teams, the ESTEEMED program to increase STEM degrees among underrepresented undergraduate students, and the Trailblazer Award to promote early stage investigators who tackle high-reward challenges.

== NIBIB: 2014-November 2017 ==
In 2014, NIBIB-sponsored research realized a major breakthrough in treating persons with complete paralysis due to spinal cord injury. This work continues and has subsequently been independently replicated at the Mayo Clinic. In 2017, researchers conducted a successful first-in-human study of a microneedle vaccine patch developed with support from an NIBIB Quantum Program grant. As well, NIBIB introduced a program in immunoengineering.

On behalf of NIH, Pettigrew currently also serves as the liaison to the U.S. Department of Energy and to the National Aeronautics and Space Administration (NASA), and is co-chairman of the Interagency Working Group on Medical Imaging, convened by the White House Office of Science & Technology Policy (OSTP). From 2013 to 2014 he served as acting chief officer for scientific workforce diversity at the NIH. He stepped down as NIBIB Director in November 2017 to assume the role of CEO of EnHealth and Executive Dean for EnMed at Texas A&M University in Houston.

== Awards and recognition ==
Pettigrew was elected to the National Academy of Medicine (NAM) in 2007. He was elected to the National Academy of Engineering (NAE) in 2010 for "the use of MRI in human blood-flow studies and for leading advancements in bioengineering research and education as the initial director of NIBIB." He was named as foreign fellow of the National Academy of Sciences India (NASI) in 2016. Pettigrew was selected as the 2020 recipient of the Vannevar Bush Award.

Other distinctions include:

- Phi Beta Kappa
- Bennie Award for Achievement, Morehouse College, 1989
- Most Distinguished Alumnus, University of Miami, 1990
- Hall of Fame, Miller School of Medicine, University of Miami
- Fellow, American Heart Association, Cardiovascular Radiology, 1993
- Fellow, American College of Cardiology, 1997
- Fellow, International Society of Magnetic Resonance in Medicine, 2003
- Herbert Nickens Award, Association of Black Cardiologists, 2008
- Distinguished Achievement Award, Biomedical Engineering Society, 2011
- Distinguished Service Award, National Medical Association
- Pierre Galletti Award of the American Institute of Medical and Biological Engineering, 2013
- Inaugural Gold Medal Award of the Academy of Radiology Research, 2014
- Honorary professor, South China University of Technology, Guangzhou, 2015
- Distinguished Service Award, International Society of Magnetic Resonance in Medicine, 2017
