= Michelle Khine =

Michelle Khine is an American bioengineer who is a distinguished scientist and innovator at the University of California, Irvine, co-founder of Fluxion Biosciences Inc., the scientific founder of the Shrink nano-technology platform, as well as the Assistant and Founding Professor of the School of Engineering at UC Merced. Khine, an associate biomedical engineering professor in the Henry Samueli School of Engineering, is responsible for experimenting with childhood toys Shrinky Dinks to build microfluidic channels. Her research has enabled technological advances in industries including biological research and medical diagnostics.

Khine is a widely published researcher, with multiple patents grants and honors including the 2009 MIT Technology Review: TR35 Award: Selected as Top 35 Innovator under 35 in the world. Michelle Khine is also on several review committees, most notable being the Center for Scientific Review at the National Institutes of Health.

== Education ==
Khine received her Bachelor of Science in 1999 and Master of Science in 2001, under Dennis Lieu, in Mechanical Engineering from University of California, Berkeley. Michelle continued her education at UC Berkeley and UCSF receiving her PhD in 2005, under Luke P. Lee, in Bioengineering. While in graduate school, she worked at Sandia National Laboratories as a MESA Fellow as well as co-founded Fluxion Biosciences (San Francisco, Ca), which was based on her dissertation work.

== Selected honors and awards ==
In November 2000, Khine and fellow collegiate Melodie Metzger set a world speed record using the UC Berkeley Human Powered Vehicle (Bearacuda), they reached a top speed of 35.6 miles per hour (57.29 km/h) to take the tandem record in the Women's 200 meter flying start speed trial.

In September 2009, Khine was honored with the 2009 MIT Technology Review TR35 Award: Selected as Top 35 Innovator under 35 in the world.

== Selected peer-reviewed publications ==
- Ionescu-Zanetti C., Blatz A., Khine, M., "Electrophoresis-Assisted Single-Cell Electroporation for Efficient Intracellular Delivery", Biomed Microdevices. 10(1):113-6, 2008.
- Grimes A., Breslauer D.N, Long M., Pegan J., Lee L.P., Khine, M., "Shrinky-Dink Microfluidics: Rapid Generation of Deep and Rounded Patterns", Lab on a Chip. 8(1):170-2, 2008. Highlighted in Chemical and Engineering News, Chemical Technology, on the Front page of American Chemical Society Homepage, (acs.org), front page of Lab on a Chip Homepage, and Wired. Most accessed paper January 2008. Lab on a Chip
- Chen, C.S., Breslauer, D.N., Luna, J.I., Grimes, A., Chin, W.C., Lee, L.P, Khine M., "Shrinky Dink Microfluidics: 3-D Polystyrene Chips," Lab on a Chip, 8, 622–624, 2008. Highlighted in Nature Medicine (May 2008). Lab on a Chip
- Nguyen, D., Pegan, J., Sa, S., McCloskey, K.E., Manilay, J.O., Khine, M.,"Shrink-Induced Honeycomb Microwells for Uniform Embryoid Bodies" accepted to Lab on a Chip. Lab on a Chip
