= Richard D. Leapman =

English physicist

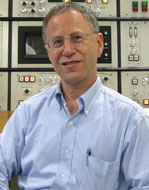
- Born: December 6, 1950 (age 75)
- Education: University of Cambridge
- Scientific career
- Fields: physics

Richard D. Leapman (born 6 December 1950) is an English physicist who is current scientific director of National Institute of Biomedical Imaging and Bioengineering (NIBIB), since October 2006 and a chief of the laboratory of bioengineering and physical science. Leapman's research interests are in the development and application of quantitative electron microscopy and the application of novel nanoscale imaging methods to solve problems in structural and cellular biology.

Leapman has been active in developing the techniques of electron energy loss spectroscopy (EELS) and scanning transmission electron microscopy (STEM) to provide an unprecedented high spatial resolution for nanoanalysis of biological structures. Leapman has devised new methods for quantifying both elemental and chemical information obtained from inelastic electron scattering, a research area in which he has over one hundred publications. Leapman has extended the techniques of energy filtered transmission electron microscopy (EFTEM) and STEM and combined them with a known technique of tomography to obtain three-dimensional structural and compositional information of cellular components.

Leapman obtained his Ph.D. in physics from the University of Cambridge, England. He serves on the editorial boards of the journal of microscopy and nanotechnology and on peer review panels.

== Awards ==
- Samuel Wesley Stratton Award from the National Institute of Technology in 1994

== Publications ==
- Chen KG, Valencia JC, Lai B, Zhang G, Paterson JK, Rouzaud F, Berens W, Wincovitch SM, Garfield SH, Leapman RD, Hearing VJ, Gottesman MM. Melanosomal sequestration of cytotoxic drugs contributes to the intractability of malignant melanomas. Proc Natl Acad Sci U S A. 2006 June 27;103(26):9903-7.
- Petkova AT, Leapman RD, Guo Z, Yau WM, Mattson MP, Tycko R. Self-propagating, molecular-level polymorphism in Alzheimer's beta-amyloid fibrils. Science. 2005 January 14;307(5707):262-5.
- Leapman RD, Kocsis E, Zhang G, Talbot TL, Laquerriere P. Three-dimensional distributions of elements in biological samples by energy-filtered electron tomography. Ultramicroscopy. 2004 July;100(1-2):115-25
- Leapman RD, Gallant PE, Reese TS, Andrews SB. Phosphorylation and subunit organization of axonal neurofilaments determined by scanning transmission electron microscopy. Proc Natl Acad Sci U S A. 1997 July 22;94(15):7820-4.
