= Shrinky Dinks =

Arts-and-crafts kit

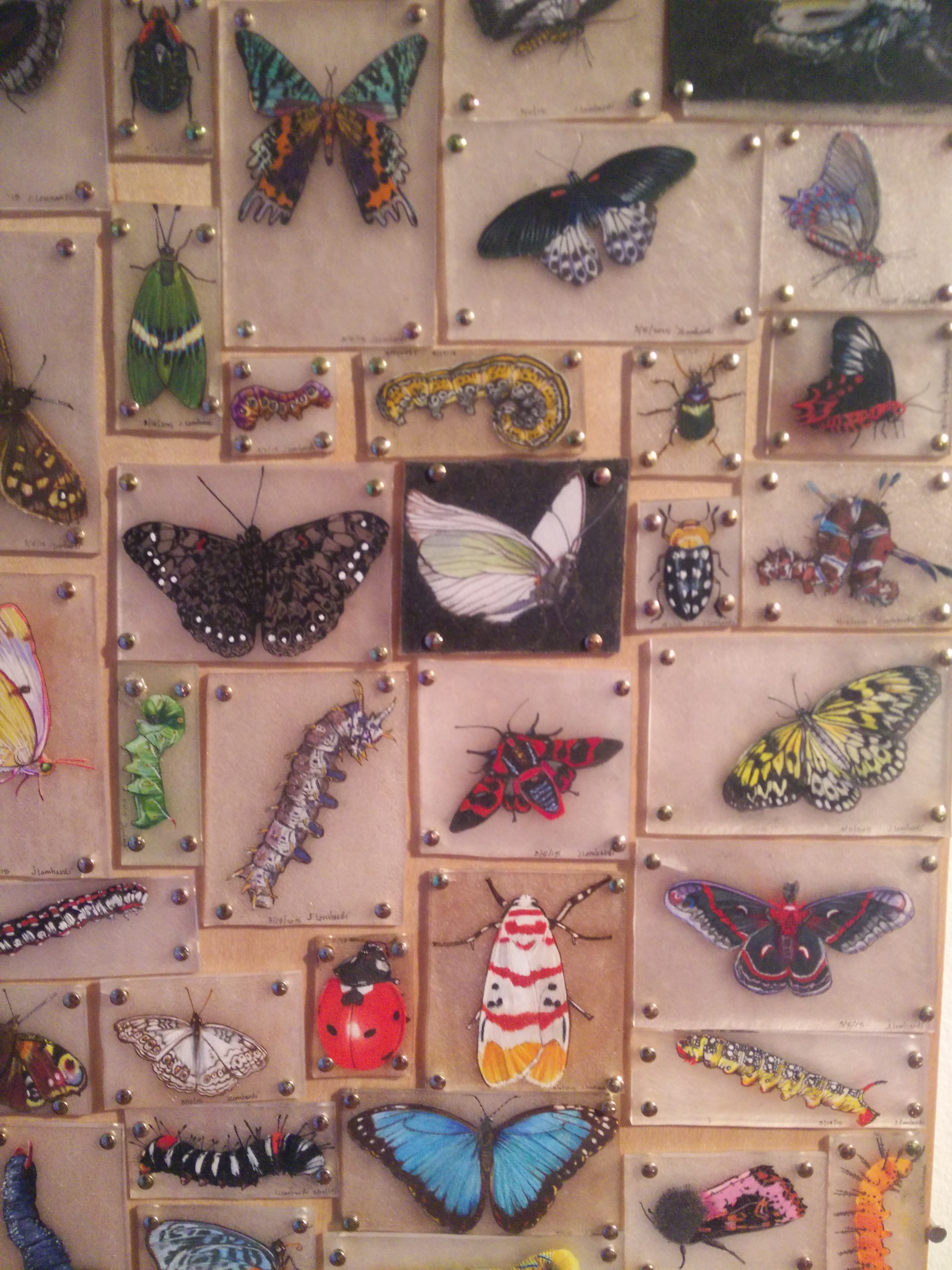
- Butterflies created with Shrinky Dinks
- Other names: Shrinkles
- Type: Toy and activity kit
- Invented by: Kate Bloomberg and Betty Morris
- Country: United States
- Materials: Polystyrene plastic

Shrink art (sold under brand names including Shrinky Dinks and Shrinkles) is a craft activity using thin sheets of polystyrene which shrink when heated. The sheets can be cut with standard household scissors, and after heating become about nine times thicker while their horizontal and vertical dimensions reduce to about one-third the original size, resulting in hard, flat forms which retain their initial color and shape. They reached the height of their popularity in the 1980s and are still available from retailers. They can be used for a variety of purposes like charms, pins, and zipper pulls. Most sets are pre-printed with outline images of popular children's characters or other subjects, which are then colored in before baking.

== History ==
Shrinky Dinks were invented in 1973 by Betty Morris and Kate Bloomberg, two housewives in Brookfield, Wisconsin, as a Cub Scout project with their sons. The first kits were sold at a local shopping mall and became very popular. Shrinky Dinks were soon licensed to be manufactured by the major toy companies of the time such as Milton Bradley, Colorforms, Western Publishing, and Skyline Toys.

Alex Brands acquired Shrinky Dinks in 2014. As of 2020, the original brand Shrinky Dinks is owned by Just Play Products.

== Usage ==
The base material consists of thin, flexible polystyrene plastic (#6) sheets. Prior to heating, the plastic sheets can be colored with felt-tip pens, acrylic paint, or colored pencils and cut into shapes. However, oily or waxy substances (such as crayons or oil paint) are not suitable because they melt or burn in high heat. When heated with an Easy-Bake Oven, a conventional oven, or a heat gun, the plastic shrinks and becomes thicker and more rigid, while retaining the colored design.

Although Shrinky Dinks are primarily an arts and crafts item marketed for children, adult crafting buffs also use the sets for jewelry making and other projects. Blank sheets are available in bulk for this purpose.

== Applications ==
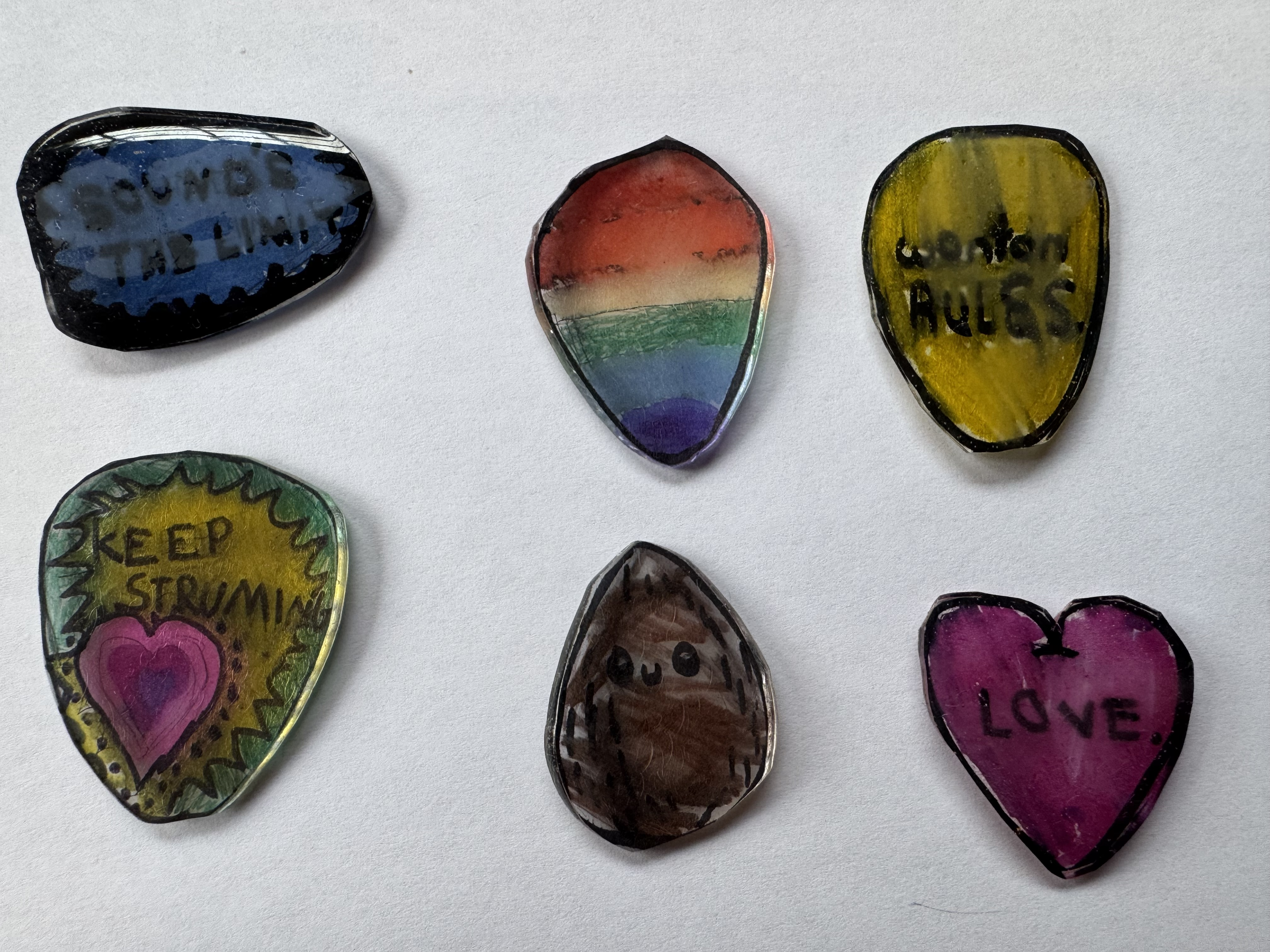
Guitar picks made from shrunken polystyrene

In 2008, University of California, Irvine Professor Michelle Khine applied Shrinky Dinks to create tiny structures for the application of microfluidics to topics such as stem cell research. In 2022, Khine researched the use of Shrinky Dinks for microscale diagnostics and wearable biosensors for monitoring health.

In 2009, an art therapy supervision class at Emporia State University explored the use of Shrinky Dinks in art therapy.

In 2014, Shrinky Dinks were presented as an art therapy medium in a workshop at the American Art Therapy Association Conference and a team from Harvard University and MIT used Shrinky Dinks to create self-assembling robots.

== In popular culture ==
In 1992, the California rock band Sugar Ray formed with the name "Shrinky Dinx", but later changed it upon threat of lawsuit from the Milton Bradley.
