= National Institute of Biomedical Imaging and Bioengineering =

U.S. health institute

Coordinates: 39.00358°N 77.10131°W

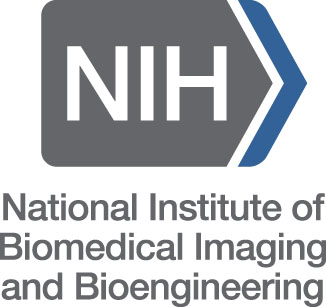

Agency overview
- Formed: 2000
- Headquarters: Bethesda, Maryland
- Agency executive: Bruce J. Tromberg, Director
- Parent agency: National Institutes of Health
- Website: nibib.nih.gov

The National Institute of Biomedical Imaging and Bioengineering (NIBIB), founded at the National Institutes of Health (NIH) in 2000, is located in Bethesda, Maryland. It is one of 27 institutes and centers that are part of NIH, an agency of the U.S. Department of Health and Human Services (HHS).

NIBIB programs accelerate the development and application of biomedical imaging and bioengineering technologies to study, diagnose, and treat human diseases. The institute is an engine and testbed for innovative biomedical technologies, which it generates at a robust rate; NIBIB is first among NIH institutes for patents generated per funding dollar.

NIBIB-funded research integrates engineering and the physical sciences with the life sciences, building on opportunities and technical discoveries in biomedicine. The institute spearheads development of medical technologies that are better, faster, smaller, less costly and more accessible to people across the United States and around the world. NIBIB prepares the life-sciences workforce for paradigm shifts and catalyzes vital biomedical advances that will impact healthcare in the 21st century.

== Leadership ==
- Bruce J. Tromberg, Ph.D., Director
  - David Rampulla, Ph.D., Deputy Director
  - Richard D. Leapman, Ph.D., Scientific Director, Intramural Research

== Past directors ==
Directors from 2001–present

No.	Portrait	Director	Took office	Left office	Refs.
Acting		Donna J. Dean	April 26, 2001	September 23, 2002	
1		Roderic I. Pettigrew	September 23, 2002	November 2017	
Acting		Jill Heemskerk	November 2017	January 8, 2019	
2		Bruce J. Tromberg	January 7, 2019	Present	

== History ==
Congress authorized NIBIB by passing the National Institute of Biomedical Imaging and Bioengineering Establishment Act H.R. 1795, signed into law by President William Clinton on December 29, 2000, as Public Law 106-580. The institute was established to synergize complementary scientific activities and to catalyze growth opportunities for biomedical imaging and engineering research within the National Institutes of Health (NIH).

== Then and Now exhibit ==
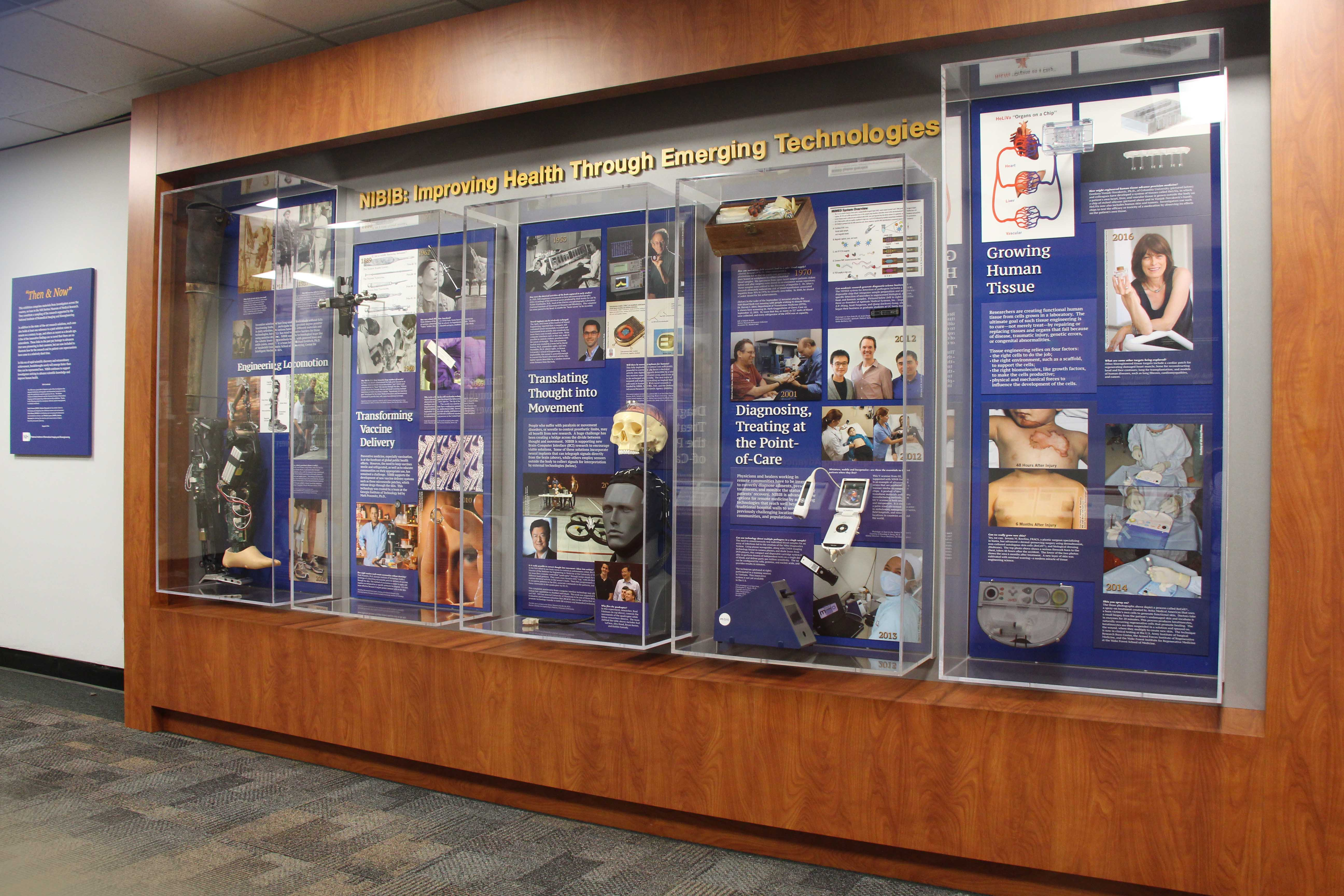
Then and Now is an exhibit at NIH depicting innovation in biomedical technologies.

Visitors to the NIBIB Office of the Director on the NIH campus in Bethesda, Maryland, will encounter an engaging exhibit of biomedical-themed objects and narrative displays called "Then and Now". The exhibit, installed in 2016, traces the development of a variety of biomedical innovations from early models to state-of-the-art prototypes that exemplify the NIBIB research portfolio. The exhibit, created through a collaboration between NIBIB and the Office of NIH History and NIH Stetten Museum, may be accessed during weekday business hours.

== Areas of research ==
NIBIB comprises an intramural research program, with laboratories on the NIH campus, and an extramural research program, which funds research at universities and institutions around the country and internationally. At its intramural research laboratories, NIBIB scientists develop state-of-the-art technologies to solve research challenges at NIH and beyond. These include electron microscope development, infrared imaging and thermometry, microfabrication and microfluidics, and scanning probe microscopy.

An even broader range of biomedical technologies is pursued by scientists supported though the NIBIB Extramural Research Program. These span the development of tissue chips for laboratory testing of drugs, biomedical imaging techniques for better diagnosis and treatment, targeted delivery and controlled release of therapeutic agents to specific sites within the body, rehabilitation engineering technologies to help people with disabilities lead more full and productive lives, point-of-care technologies for rapid diagnosis and treatment of infectious and non-infectious diseases, and more. The institute provides informational fact sheets that explain biomedical and bioengineering research topics, such as Computational Modeling, Drug Delivery Systems, Image-Guided Robotic Interventions, Magnetic Resonance Imaging (MRI), Mammography, Rehabilitation Engineering, and Tissue Engineering and Regenerative Medicine. The institute provides training opportunities to introduce and help propel the careers of talented researchers into the biomedical imaging and bioengineering fields.

== Science educational resources ==
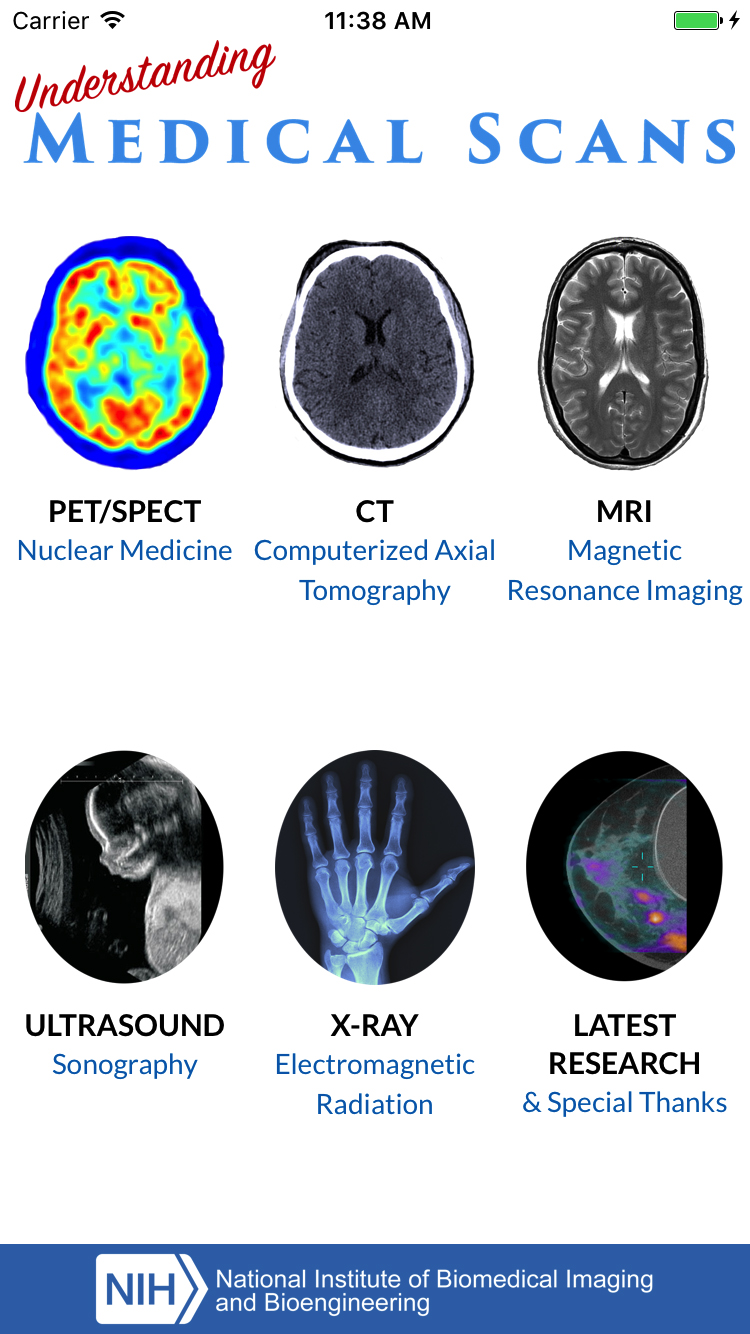
Understanding Medical Scans, an app for free download at the App Store

NIBIB offers science education resources for people of all ages who want to explore biomedical imaging and bioengineering topics. Among the resources are 60 Seconds of Science short videos explaining various aspects of imaging and bioengineering, as well mobile device apps with patient-friendly information about the Future of Surgery and Understanding Medical Scans, the Bionic Man interactive click-and-learn page, and the quiz game Want to be a Bioengineer?
