= Petra Wilder-Smith =

American professor of dentistry

- Education: University of London, University of Bern, Aachen University
- Scientific career
- Workplaces: Beckman Laser Institute
- Thesis: "Optical Diagnostics in the Oral Cavity"

Petra Elfrida Erna Beate Wilder-Smith is a professor and director of dentistry at the Beckman Laser Institute at the University of California, Irvine School of Medicine, and a fellow of the Chao Family Comprehensive Cancer Center at the UC Irvine Medical Center. She is a visiting professor at RWTH Aachen University and a visiting lecturer at Loma Linda University. Wilder-Smith specializes in the use of light and optics in tracking and treating oral cancer. She has developed noninvasive laser technology used to examine and treat mouth lesions.

== Career ==
Wilder-Smith attended Guy's Hospital at the University of London, receiving her dental degree in July, 1983. Also in 1983, she was awarded the Diplomate of the Royal College of Surgeons of Great Britain. In 1985, Wilder-Smith received a doctorate from the University of Bern for her work in restorative dentistry.

Wilder-Smith served as junior faculty at Guy's Hospital in the department of oral medicine and at Heidelberg University in Germany, gaining certification in the specialty of oral medicine from Heidelberg in 1986. She was awarded the inaugural Research Prize for Endodontology by the European Society of Endodontology in 1987 for her innovative work applying Laser Doppler flowmetry techniques to oral research. While at Heidelberg, she received the university's Best Clinician Award in 1988, and Best Lecturer Award and Stauffenberg Award for innovative research in 1989. In 1999, Wilder-Smith was awarded a doctorate in biomedical optics from Aachen University.

In 1991, Wilder-Smith joined the Beckman Laser Institute as assistant director of the Dental Program. She became associate director of the Dental Program and Adjunct Assistant Professor as of 1993, Director of Dental Program and Adjunct Assistant Professor as of 1995, Director of the Dental Program and Associate Professor as of 1998, and Director of the Dental Program and Professor as of 2008.

== Research ==
Wilder-Smith's research focuses on noninvasive optical techniques such as fluorescence and optical coherence tomography and their use in the diagnosis of oral cancer. She is particularly concerned with developing technologies for the early detection of precancerous and cancerous tissues in the mouth. She has collaborated with researchers at the City of Hope, UCLA, the University of Pennsylvania and elsewhere, publishing more than 100 publications in over 20 years. She has received funding from the National Institutes of Health, the United States Department of Defense, and others.

Wilder-Smith is working with Dr. Zhongping Chen at the University of California, Irvine, Dr Rongguang Liang at the University of Arizona's College of Optical Sciences, and Dr. M. A. Kuriakose at the Mazumdar-Shaw Cancer Center in Bangalore, India to develop an inexpensive portable device for detection of oral cancer, which accounts for 35% of cancer deaths among Indian men. The solar-powered device, slightly larger than a shoebox, uses mobile phone technology to send laser images of oral lesions to specialists for assessment.

Wilder-Smith serves on advisory boards of the American Society for Laser Medicine and Surgery, the Diagnostic Sciences Group of the International Association for Dental Research and the Prevent Cancer Foundation. She serves on the editorial boards of the Journal of Photomedicine and Laser Surgery, the Journal of Biomedical Optics and the journal Lasers in Surgery and Medicine.
