= Magnus Egerstedt =

Swedish-American roboticist

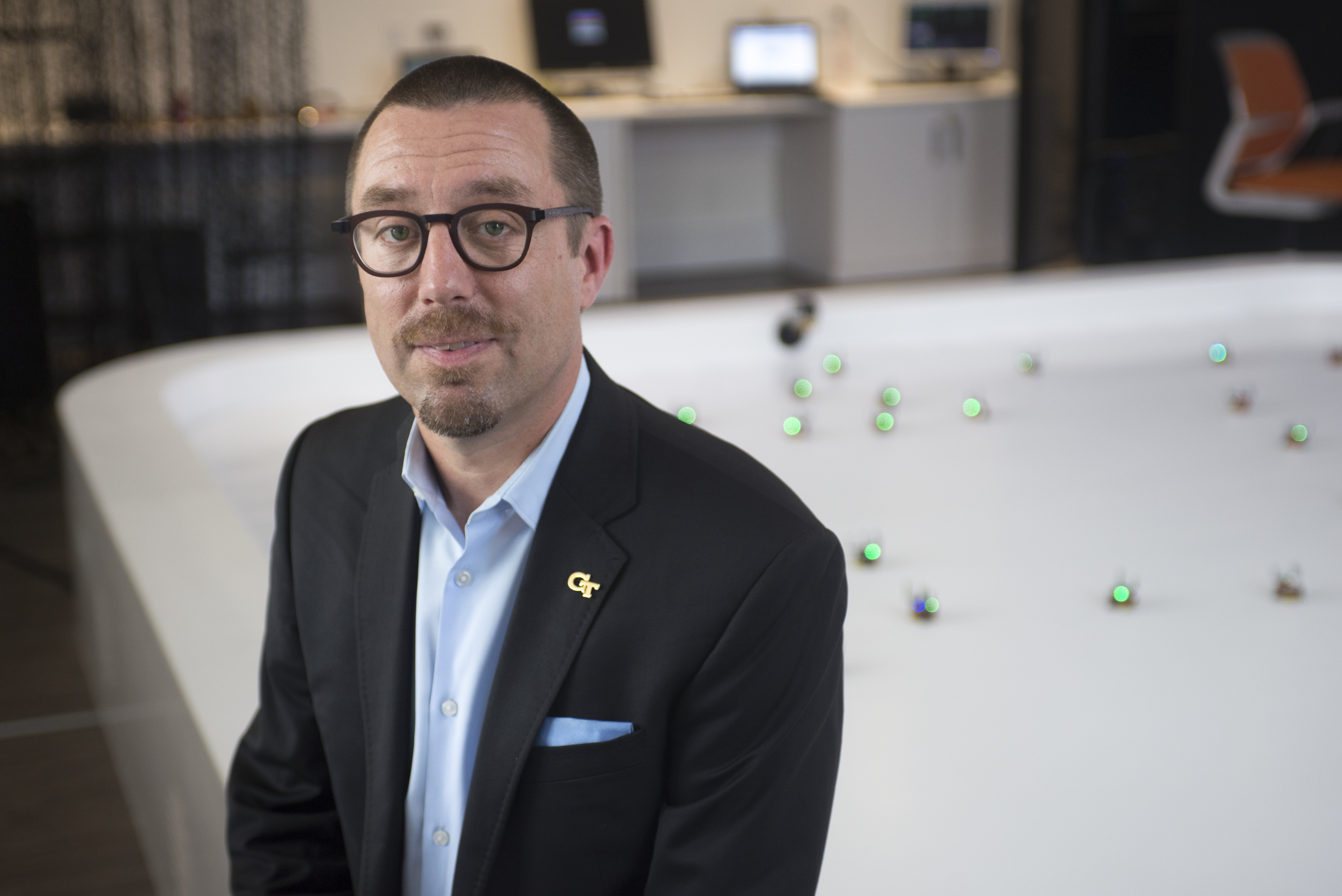
- Born: June 28, 1971 (age 55); Täby Municipality, Stockholm, Sweden
- Education: Royal Institute of Technology; Stockholm University
- Scientific career
- Fields: Robotics; Control theory
- Workplaces: Georgia Institute of Technology; University of California, Irvine
- Doctoral advisor: Xiaoming Hu; Anders Lindquist

Magnus B. Egerstedt (born June 28, 1971) is a Swedish-American roboticist who is the Executive Vice Chancellor and Provost of the University of North Carolina at Chapel Hill since March 2026.

He was formerly the Dean of the Henry Samueli School of Engineering at the University of California, Irvine. and Steve C. Chaddick School Chair and Professor at the School of Electrical and Computer Engineering, Georgia Institute of Technology.

Egerstedt is a major contributor to the theory of hybrid and discrete event systems, and in particular, the control of multi-agent systems.

== Biography ==
=== Education ===
Magnus Egerstedt was born in Täby Municipality, Stockholm, Sweden in 1971. He received his B.A. from Stockholm University in Theoretical Philosophy in 1996, specializing in language philosophy and with a thesis titled Implicit Knowledge and Public Mathematical Meaning, while simultaneously attending the Royal Institute of Technology, where he received in 1996 an M.S. in engineering physics. During this period, Egerstedt visited Texas Tech University in Lubbock, Texas, and completed his M.S. thesis A Model of the Combined Planar Motion of the Human Head and Eye. In 2000, Egerstedt completed a Ph.D. in applied mathematics under the advisement of Xiaoming Hu and Anders Lindquist for the thesis Motion Planning and Control of Mobile Robots. At KTH, Egerstedt was affiliated with (and the first graduate from) the Center for Autonomous Systems.

=== Career ===
In 1998, Egerstedt was a visiting scholar at the Robotics Laboratory at the University of California, Berkeley, where he collaborated with Shankar S. Sastry on the hybrid control of mobile robotics. From 2000 to 2001, he was a postdoctoral fellow under Roger W. Brockett at the School of Engineering and Applied Sciences, Harvard University, focusing on formal methods for robot control.

Egerstedt joined the Georgia Institute of Technology as a faculty member in the School of Electrical and Computer Engineering in 2001, where he has held the positions of Schlumberger Professor (2013–2016), Julian T. Hightower Chair in Systems and Controls (2016–2018), and Associate Chair for Research (2014–2016). In August 2018, he was appointed as the Steve W. Chaddick School Chair of the School of Electrical and Computer Engineering. Egerstedt also holds adjunct appointments in the School of Interactive Computing, the Guggenheim School of Aerospace Engineering, and the Woodruff School of Mechanical Engineering at the Georgia Institute of Technology.

In 2016, Egerstedt was named the executive director of the Institute for Robotics and Intelligent Machines, a position he held for two years. In 2017, Egerstedt launched the Robotarium, a swarm-robotic research testbed whose goal is to provide access to a state-of-the-art test facility to researchers around the globe.

In July 2021, Egerstedt joined the University of California, Irvine, where he was the Stacey Nicholas Dean of the Henry Samueli School of Engineering.

In November 2025, Egerstedt was appointed as Executive Vice Chancellor and Provost of the University of North Carolina at Chapel Hill, effective March 2, 2026.

=== Honors and awards ===
Egerstedt has earned a number of teaching and research awards and honors during his career:

- CAREER award from the U.S. National Science Foundation in 2003 for the project Linguistic Control of Mobile Robots.
- Outstanding Junior Faculty Member Award, School of Electrical and Computer Engineering, Georgia Institute of Technology, 2005.
- Fellow of the IEEE (Controls Systems & Robotics and Automation Societies), 2012.
- Distinguished Lecturer, IEEE Control Systems Society (2013–2015).
- Royal Institute of Technology Alumnus of the Year, 2013.
- Georgia Tech Outstanding Doctoral Thesis Advisor Award, 2015.
- John R. Ragazzini Award, American Automatic Control Council, 2015.
- IEEE International Conference on Robotics and Automation, Best Multi-Robot Systems Paper Award, 2017.
- Foreign Member of the Royal Swedish Academy of Engineering Sciences, 2019

== The Robotarium ==
The Robotarium is a remotely accessible swarm robotics testbed designed and developed by Magnus Egerstedt at Georgia Tech. The Robotarium provides researchers working on swarm robotics access to both ground and aerial robots. Since its launch in August 2017, over 200 research groups from all continents except Antarctica have used the Robotarium.

== Publications ==
Egerstedt has authored over 400 research papers in the areas of robotics and control, including the books:

- 2008, M. Egerstedt and B. Mishra, (editors). Hybrid Systems: Computation and Control. Proceedings of the 11th International Workshop (St. Louis), HSCC 2008, Lecture Notes in Computer Science Series, Springer, April 2008. 680 pp. ISBN 978-3-540-78928-4.
- 2010, Egerstedt, Magnus; Mesbahi, Mehran Graph Theoretic Methods in Multiagent Networks. New Jersey: Princeton University Press; July 2010. 424 pp. ISBN 978-0-691-14061-2.
