= Iconoclast (band) =

New York jazz duo

Iconoclast is a New York avant jazz duo consisting of Julie Joslyn (alto saxophone, live electronics, violin, vocals) and Leo Ciesa (drums, percussion, keyboards, vocals). Iconoclast has been performing and recording since 1987 and has released eleven studio albums, and is featured in All About Jazz.

The duo has received an Artist's Fellowship in Music Composition from the New York Foundation for the Arts as well as grants from Meet the Composer and from Arts International: The Fund for U.S. Artists at International Festivals and Exhibitions, now known as Mid Atlantic Arts Foundation: US Artists International.

Iconoclast has performed at festivals in The United States, Canada, Italy, Poland, Hungary, Serbia, Czech Republic, and Slovenia. The duo performed regularly beginning in 1988 at the New York clubs CBGB and the Knitting Factory. Iconoclast collaborated and performed with Polish poet Andrzej Dorobek (pl).

== Media ==
Iconoclast also composed and performed the music for the documentary film "Savage Acts: Wars, Fairs and Empire" and the online exploration game “The Lost Museum”, both by the American Social History Project (ASHP), and the soundtracks for the films “The Bench” (Poland, 2010) and “Con gli occhi di domain”/“With Tomorrow's Eyes” (Italy, 2006).

Created between 1996 and 2005, the Lost Museum is a project concerning the history of P.T. Barnum's American Museum in New York City through its destruction in 1865.

== Discography ==
- Cobalt Confidential (Fang Records, 2025)
- Demolition of Wisdom (Fang Records, 2022)
- Driven to Defiance (Fang Records, 2017)
- Naked Rapture (Fang Records, 2014)
- Dirty Jazz (Fang Records, 2010)
- The Body Never Lies (Fang Records, 2006)
- The Dreadful Dance (Fang Records, 2005)
- In The Vodka Garden (Record One, Russia, 2005)
- Paradise (Fang Records, 2000)
- Blood is Red (Fang Records, 1995)
- The Speed of Desire (Fang Records, 1992)
- City of Temptation (Fang Records, 1990)
- Sins of New York (Cassette, 1989)

=== Collections ===
- ARR GGG HHHH !!!!!: Antonio Murga and Friends (Hamfuggi Records, Spain, 2024)
- The NYFA Collection: 25 Years of New York New Music (Innova, 2010)
- Transforms: The Nerve Events Project (Cuneiform, 1993)

== See also ==
- Barnum's American Museum, New York City
- Barnum Museum, Bridgeport, Connecticut
