= Mehran Mesbahi =

Mehran Mesbahi is an Iranian-American control theorist and aerospace engineer. He is a Professor of Aeronautics and Astronautics, and Adjunct Professor of Electrical Engineering and Mathematics at the University of Washington in Seattle. His research is on systems and control theory over networks, optimization, and aerospace controls.

Mehran Mesbahi earned his Ph.D. from the University of Southern California in June 1996. From July 1996 until December 1999, he was with the Guidance and Control Analysis Group of the Jet Propulsion Laboratory at California Institute of Technology. During this time, he also had appointments in the Department of Electrical Engineering- Systems at USC (1997–1998) and in the Department of Control and Dynamical Systems at Caltech (1998–1999). From January 2000 to July 2002, he was an assistant professor of aerospace engineering and mechanics at the University of Minnesota-Twin Cities.

== Honors and awards ==
- IEEE Fellow
- University of Washington College of Engineering Innovator Award, 2008
- University of Washington Distinguished Teaching Award, 2005
- NASA Space Act Award, 2004
- National Science Foundation CAREER Award, 2001

== Selected publications ==
- M. Mesbahi and Magnus Egerstedt, Graph-theoretic Methods in Multiagent Networks, Princeton University Press, 2010.
- A. Rahmani, M. Ji, M. Mesbahi, and M. Egerstedt. Controllability of multi-agent systems from a graph theoretic perspective, SIAM Journal on Control and Optimization, 48 (1): 162-186, 2009.
- M. Mesbahi. On state-dependent dynamic graphs and their controllability properties, IEEE Transactions on Automatic Control (50) 3: 387- 392, 2005.
- Y. Hatano and M. Mesbahi. Agreement over random networks, IEEE Transactions on Automatic Control, (50) 11: 1867-1872, 2005.
- M. Mesbahi and F. Y. Hadaegh. Formation flying of multiple spacecraft via graphs, matrix inequalities, and switching, AIAA Journal of Guidance, Control, and Dynamics, (24) 2: 369-377, 2001.
