= Ahmed M. Eltawil =

Researcher in wireless systems

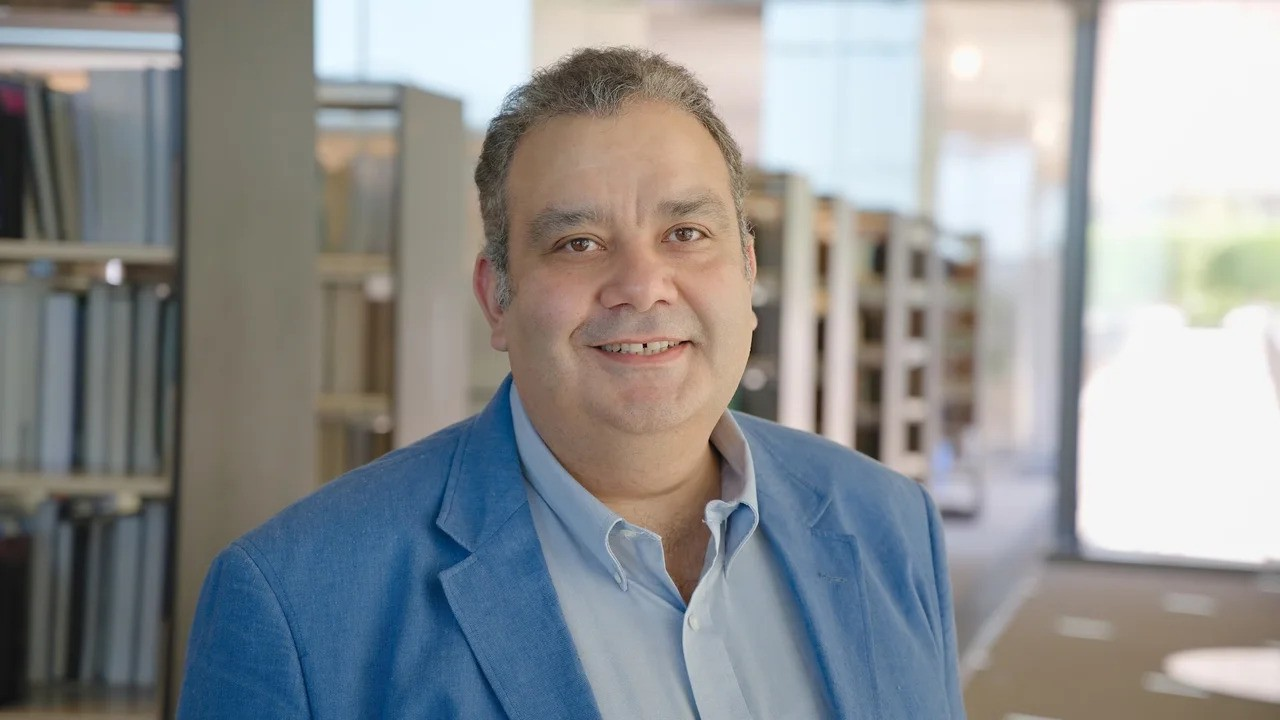
- Ahmed M. Eltawil in 2025
- Born: Cairo, Egypt
- Education: Cairo University; University of California, Los Angeles
- Known for: Wireless and AI-native communication and computing systems, full-duplex, body-centric, and low-power architectures
- Scientific career
- Fields: Electrical and computer engineering
- Workplaces: King Abdullah University of Science and Technology (KAUST); University of California, Irvine

Ahmed M. Eltawil is a professor of electrical and computer engineering and Associate Dean for Research in the Computer, Electrical, and Mathematical Science and Engineering (CEMSE) Division at King Abdullah University of Science and Technology (KAUST), Saudi Arabia. He is also a member of the executive committee of the KAUST Center of Excellence on Smart Health. Prior to joining KAUST, he was a faculty member at the University of California, Irvine. His research interests include next-generation wireless networks, artificial intelligence for communication systems, and emerging technologies at the intersection of computing and connectivity.

== Early life and education ==
Eltawil earned his B.Sc. and M.S. degrees in electronics and communications engineering from Cairo University in 1997 and 1999, respectively. He received his Ph.D. in electrical engineering from the University of California, Los Angeles (UCLA) in 2003, focusing on low-power wireless transceiver design and digital signal processing architectures for communication systems.

== Academic career ==
In 2005, Eltawil joined the faculty of the University of California, Irvine (UCI), where he founded the Wireless Systems and Circuits Laboratory (WSCL). His research attracted funding from the National Science Foundation (NSF), the Department of Justice, and industry partners. He received the Henry Samueli Faculty Fellowship, the NSF CAREER Award in 2010, and was named UCI Innovator of the Year in 2021. Eltawil has been recognized by IEEE-affiliated organizations for his contributions to wireless technologies and has received two certificates of merit from the United States Congress.

In 2019, he joined King Abdullah University of Science and Technology (KAUST), where he founded and leads the Communications and Computing Systems Laboratory (CCSL). As of 2025, Eltawil serves as the Associate Dean for Research in the CEMSE Division at KAUST. His research at KAUST includes efficient architectures for computing and communications systems and wireless networks, encompassing low-power mobile systems, sensor networks, body-area networks, cyber-physical systems and critical infrastructure networks.

== Industry and entrepreneurship ==
Eltawil has co-founded and advised several technology startups. As a graduate student at UCLA, he co-founded Innovics Wireless with advisor Babak Daneshrad. In 2004, he co-founded Silvus Technologies, which developed MIMO mesh networking radios; in 2025, Motorola Solutions announced plans to acquire the company. He also served as a principal founding consultant with Newport Media, acquired by Atmel in 2014. In 2015, he founded Lextrum, a startup focused on full-duplex wireless and real-time spectrum sharing, which was acquired by Transform-X in 2017.

== Research contributions ==
Eltawil has authored numerous publications in wireless systems, listed in IEEE Xplore. His research has emphasized low‑power, high‑performance, and reconfigurable wireless system design, including full‑duplex wireless communication using digital self‑interference cancellation to enable simultaneous transmission and reception on the same frequency band.

He has also worked on human‑body communication (HBC) systems involving ultra‑low‑power architectures for physiological monitoring using the human body as a communication medium, featuring novel modulation and coupling techniques for energy‑efficient implants and body‑area networks.
