= Iconoclast: A Neuroscientist Reveals How to Think Differently =

2008 book by Gregory Berns

Iconoclast: a Neuroscientist Reveals How to Think Differently
- Author: Gregory Berns
- Language: English
- Subject: Neuropsychology
- Genre: Non-fiction
- Publisher: Harvard Business Press
- Publication date: September 2, 2008
- Publication place: United States
- Media type: Print (Hardcover, Paperback), e-book
- Pages: 250 pp
- ISBN: 978-1-4221-1501-5

Iconoclast: a Neuroscientist Reveals How to Think Differently is a neuropsychology book written by Gregory Berns and first published in 2008 by Harvard Business Press. The text describes how iconoclasts leverage perception, imagination, fear, and social intelligence to achieve success.

== Major Sections ==
The book has eight major sections. The people referenced in each section are listed below.

== Reviews ==
"Iconoclast is an eye-opener that will both inform and inspire you. Though most of us want to be innovative thinkers, we just don't understand the barriers in the way of our success. In this book, Gregory Berns deftly blends intriguing case studies with exciting neuroscientific findings to show how and why iconoclasts overcome these barriers and thrive."

—Michael J. Mauboussin, chief investment strategist at Legg Mason Capital Management and author of More Than You Know: Finding Financial Wisdom in Unconventional Places

"Iconoclast introduces you to people in every field who make success look easy. These people can reconcile the brain's quest for certainty with life's inherent uncertainty by seeing different facets of life. They ask questions that do not occur to the population that simply accepts consensus answers. You'll be inspired to emulate these iconoclasts in your own life."

—Dean LeBaron, Chairman, virtualquest

"In Iconoclast, Gregory Berns tells the stories of monumental events in art, medicine, technology, and more. Through the eyes of a neuroscientist, he helps us understand the underlying processes that either hinder or encourage creativity and an iconoclastic perspective. In today's world we cannot afford to be ignorant of either these processes or our history."

—Dun Ariely, Author, Predictably Irrational
