= Abdeslam Al Mesbahi =

Moroccan politician (born 1954)

Secretary of State for Territorial Development
- In office 8 October 2007 – 3 January 2012
- Preceded by: none (position created)
- Succeeded by: none (position discontinued)

Personal details
- Born: 1954 (age 71–72) Taza, Morocco
- Party: Istiqlal Party
- Occupation: Politician

Abdeslam Al Mesbahi (Arabic: عبد السلام المصباحي born 1954, in Taza) is a Moroccan politician of the Istiqlal Party. Between 2007 and 2012, he held the position of Secretary of State for Territorial Development in the cabinet of Abbas El Fassi.

== See also ==
- Cabinet of Morocco
