= Beckman Laser Institute =

Research center at the University of California, Irvine

Coordinates: 33.644201°N 117.849932°W

- Founders: Michael W. Berns, Arnold O. Beckman
- Established: 1982 (foundation), 1986 (facility)
- Acting Director: Bernard Choi
- Address: 1002 Health Sciences Rd., Irvine, CA 92617
- Location: University of California, Irvine, Irvine, California, United States of America
- Website: http://www.bli.uci.edu/

The Beckman Laser Institute (sometimes called the Beckman Laser Institute and Medical Clinic) is an interdisciplinary research center for the development of optical technologies and their use in biology and medicine. Located on the campus of the University of California, Irvine in Irvine, California, an independent nonprofit corporation was created in 1982, under the leadership of Michael W. Berns, and the actual facility opened on June 4, 1986. It is one of a number of institutions focused on translational research, connecting research and medical applications. Researchers at the institute have developed laser techniques for the manipulation of structures within a living cell, and applied them medically in treatment of skin conditions, stroke, and cancer, among others.

== History ==
Around 1980, Michael W. Berns, a professor of biology at the University of California, Irvine, founded an institute focusing on the then-new technology of lasers. After receiving a National Institutes of Health biotechnology grant, he established a laboratory for laser microscopy, the Laser Microbeam Program (LAMP). He then proposed the creation of an interdisciplinary center which would combine research into lasers and their applications in medical treatment.

Berns obtained the support of local philanthropists Arnold O. Beckman (1900-2004) and his wife Mabel (1900-1989). The Beckmans were interested in the potential of the new instruments, and agreed to partner with the university in funding the development of an independent center which would eventually become the property of the university. Beckman presented a $2.5 million matching check to Dan Aldrich, the Chancellor of UCI. Other early supporters of the Beckman Laser Institute included David Packard of Hewlett-Packard, who donated $2 million, SmithKline Beckman Corp. which donated $1 million, and the Irvine Community Foundation. Arnold Beckman and Michael W. Berns were listed as co-founders in the institution's bylaws.

The institute was established as an independent nonprofit corporation in 1982, under the leadership of Michael W. Berns. The actual facility opened on June 4, 1986.

The current acting director is Bernard Choi

== Research ==
External videos
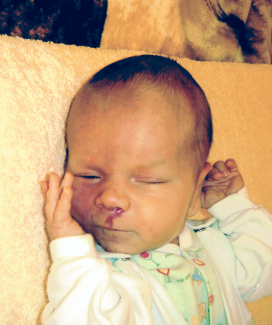
- From Benchtop to Beside: Take a tour of the Beckman Laser Institute, Beckman Laser
- Inside the Beckman Laser Institute, CEN

Early research into the use of lasers included the development of techniques for the manipulation of structures within a living cell. What Bern terms "Laser scissors" use short pulses of high irradiance to create targeted effects. Optoporation has been used to create tiny openings into the interior of a cell, enabling the genetic manipulation of cells by the insertion and deletion of genes, and the extraction and examination of microplasma from within the cell. Laser ablation can be used to destroy or inactivate cells. Lasers can also be used to optically trap cellular structures. "Laser tweezers" use continuous, low-irradiance beams that pass through substances without causing damage. The refraction of a pair of symmetric laser light rays within a beam can be modified and cause the target to respond to the change in momentum of the light rays.

More advanced research has included optical techniques such as Multiphoton microscopy, Second-harmonic imaging microscopy, Photoacoustic tomography, nonlinear Raman spectroscopy, and diffuse optical spectroscopy.

Multiphoton microscopy (MPM) and second-harmonic generation (SHG) can be used to obtain high-resolution, noninvasive images of thick biological tissues. Researchers are working on the development of small, portable multiphoton systems using femtosecond fiber lasers as a light source, for use in clinical applications and in vivo imaging.

Photoacoustic tomography enables researchers to create three-dimensional images of deep tissue. A laser must be carefully tuned to excite specific bonds so that they "rattle", creating noise that can be detected and mapped by passive acoustic systems.

Raman spectroscopy uses Raman scattering of monochromatic light, causing changes in the energy level of a few molecules which then can be detected. Raman spectroscopy and other infrared techniques have been used to detect cancer lesions.

Diffuse optical spectroscopy allows researchers to look deep within the body without disturbing tissue. This technique has been used to measure Haemodynamic response within the brain. A beam of near-infrared light is sent through optic fibers resting on the skin, and the scattering of light is measured, allowing researchers to assess the oxygenated and deoxygenated hemoglobin within the brain's blood vessels.

Spatial frequency domain imaging (SFDI) is a reflectance technique that models absorption coefficients and reduced scattering coefficients in thick tissue. SFDI can detect subsurface damage to bruised tissues such as the skin or brain by examining hemoglobin levels. It can also be used to assess burn damage.

== Applications ==
External audio
- "Rethinking Ink", Distillations Podcast Episode 220, Science History Institute

Applications in Biophotonics include the treatment of birthmarks such as Port-wine stain and the removal of tattoos, the detection of bleeding in stroke patients, non-invasive detection of skin cancer and oral lesions, and monitoring of the effects of chemotherapy in breast cancer patients.

Judge David O. Carter has worked with Michael W. Berns, J. Stuart Nelson and others at the Beckman Laser Institute to develop an innovative program that helps parolees to reintegrate into society by having gang tattoos removed. The removal of visible tattoos on the face, neck and hands increases people's potential to be hired, gaining an income and a sense of purpose.

== Faculty ==
Faculty at the Beckman Laser Institute have included:

- J. Stuart Nelson
- Petra Wilder-Smith
