= Michael W. Berns =

American biologist (1942–2022)

- Born: December 1, 1942; Burlington, Vermont, U.S.
- Died: August 13, 2022 (aged 79)
- Education: Cornell University (BS, MS, PhD)
- Spouse: Roberta M. Berns (died 2015)
- Children: 2, including Gregory
- Scientific career
- Fields: Medical use of lasers
- Workplaces: Beckman Laser Institute; University of California, Irvine; University of California, San Diego

Michael W. Berns (December 1, 1942 – August 13, 2022) was an American biologist who was a professor of surgery and cell biology at the University of California, Irvine (UCI), and an adjunct professor of bioengineering at the University of California, San Diego. Berns was a founder of the first Laser Microbeam Program (LAMP), the Beckman Laser Institute, the UCI Center for Biomedical Engineering, and the UCI Photonics Incubator.

His pioneering work focused on the use of laser technology in medical and biological research. He developed tools and techniques for the surgical use of lasers, down to the level of manipulating single cells and individual chromosomes. Berns published extensively on use of lasers in both biomedical research and medical treatment of illnesses including skin disorders, vascular disease, eye problems, and cancer.

== Early life and education ==
Berns was born in Burlington, Vermont, on December 1, 1942. He received his B.S. from Cornell University, Ithaca, New York, in 1964, followed by his M.S. in 1966 and his Ph.D. in 1968. From 1968 to 1970, he held a postdoctoral position at the Pasadena Foundation for Medical Research, Pasadena, California.

== Career ==
Berns was an assistant professor in the department of zoology of the University of Michigan, Ann Arbor from 1970 to 1972. He then joined the University of California, Irvine (UCI) as an associate professor and department chair in the Department of Developmental and Cell Biology. He was named the Arnold and Mabel Beckman Professor in 1988. In addition to a number of appointments at the University of California, Irvine, he became an adjunct professor in the Department of Biomedical Engineering at the University of California, San Diego in 2000.

Berns founded the first Laser Microbeam Program (LAMP) at UCI in 1979. Sponsored by the National Institutes of Health (NIH) as a National Biotechnology Resource, the LAMP center's sophisticated laser microsurgery instruments could be used by cell biologists from across the country.

Berns co-founded the Beckman Laser Institute at UCI in 1982, with support from Arnold Beckman. The nonprofit institute for translational research opened on June 4, 1986. Berns was its first director, serving from 1982 to 2003.

Berns was also a founding director of the UCI Center for Biomedical Engineering, from 1999 to 2000, and founded the UCI Photonics Incubator in 1999.

== Research ==
In 2006, Berns received the Biomedical Optics Lifetime Achievement Award at SPIE's International Symposium on Biomedical Optics, "for his contributions to the development and growth of laser microbeam technology, a major step towards establishing new tools for understanding laser interactions with biological tissues, which have resulted in significant improvements in diagnosis and treatment of disease." Sometimes referred to as the "father of laser microbeams," Berns wrote over 480 articles and 6 books.

In 1969, Berns published a generative paper on use of lasers for subcellular surgery in Nature. Using an argon laser with a phase-contrast microscope, small lesions were placed at specifically chosen sites on the chromosomes of cells sensitized with chemical fluorophores. In subsequent research, Berns and others found that Nd:YAG lasers could be used to cut organelles such as mitochondria or stress fibers without prior sensitization. This landmark study concluded that focusable laser light could have wide application to the ablation of cell components in biological systems. When combined with a light microscope to display the structures in a living cell, lasers could be used to selectively target those structures with minimum damage to surrounding structures.

Since then Berns investigated the basic interactions of light beams at the levels of tissues, cells, and molecules. He developed tools and techniques such as "laser scissors" and "laser tweezers" for manipulation of structures within a living cell, that can be used for the examination of cell biology and treatment of molecular pathology.

== Personal life and death ==
Berns was married to Roberta M. Berns, a human development researcher who also taught at the University of California, Irvine as well as at Saddleback College, until her death in 2015. The couple had two children, a son and a daughter. His son Gregory Berns is a professor of neuroeconomics at Emory University, and his daughter is an English professor at Mt. San Antonio College.

Berns died on August 13, 2022, at the age of 79.

== Awards and honors ==
Honors and awards include the following:

- 2022, SPIE Gold Medal
- 2014, Fellow of the Royal Society of Biology (GB)
- 2008, Fellow, International Society of Optics and Photonics (SPIE)
- 2007, The Michael W. Berns Award for Research Excellence: established by the Vascular Birthmark Foundation
- 2006, Biomedical Optics Lifetime Achievement Award, SPIE
- 2000, Fellow, American Institute for Biomedical Engineering
- 1994, The UCI Medal
- 1992, Elected member, Royal Norwegian Society of Sciences and Letters
- 1990, William B. Mark Award of the American Society for Lasers in Medicine and Surgery
- 1983, Fellow of the American Association for Advancement of Science (AAAS)

== Books ==
- Berns, Michael W. (1974). Biological microirradiation: classical and laser sources. Englewood Cliffs, N.J., Prentice-Hall: Prentice-Hall. ISBN 978-0-13-077032-5.
- Berns, Michael W. (1977). Cells. New York: Holt, Rinehart & Winston. ISBN 978-0-03-013456-2., 2nd edition 1983.
- Berns, Michael W., ed. (1984). Hematoporphyrin derivative photoradiation therapy of cancer. New York: A.R. Liss, Inc. ISBN 978-0-8451-0237-4.
- Berns, Michael W.; Mirhoseini, Mahmood, eds. (1985). Laser application to occlusive vascular disease. New York: A.R. Liss. ISBN 978-0-8451-0246-6.
- Berns, Michael W., ed. (1988). Laser interaction with tissue: 11-13 January 1988, Los Angeles, California. Bellingham, Wash., USA: SPIE. ISBN 978-0-89252-943-8.
- Berns, Michael W.; Greulich, Karl Otto, eds. (2007). Laser manipulation of cells and tissues. Amsterdam: Elsevier/Academic Press. ISBN 978-0-12-370648-5.
