= Orchard (disambiguation) =

An orchard is an intentional planting of trees or shrubs maintained for food production.

Orchard(s) may also refer to:

- Seed orchard, refers usually to a place where seeds for forest culture are produced
- Orchard (surname)
- Orchard FM, an independent radio station in England
- Orchard Books, a children's book publisher
- Orchard oriole (Icterus spurius), a small blackbird
- Orchard (RTD), a transit station in Greenwood Village, Colorado
- Orchard (VTA), a transit station in San Jose, California
- Operation Orchard, Israeli airstrike in Syria

== Places ==
=== Australia ===
- Orchard Hills, New South Wales

=== Singapore ===
- Orchard Road, a road in Singapore where the retail and entertainment hub of the city-state is located
- Orchard Towers, a Shopping Centre in Orchard Road, Singapore

=== South Africa ===
- Orchards, Gauteng
- Orchards, Johannesburg

=== United Kingdom ===
- East Orchard, a village in England
- West Orchard, a village in England
- Orchard Farm, a country house in England
- Orchard Portman, a parish/village in England
- Orchard Wyndham, a historic house and estate in Somerset, England
- Orchards, Surrey, a country house in England

=== United States ===
- Orchard, Colorado, in Morgan County
- Orchard City, Colorado, in Delta County
- Orchard Mesa, Colorado, in Mesa County
- Orchard Hill, Georgia
- Orchard, Iowa
- Orchard Lake Village, Michigan
- Orchard Farm, Missouri
- Orchard Homes, Montana
- Orchard, Nebraska
- Orchard, Texas
- Orchard Grove, Wisconsin
- Orchards, Washington
- Piney Orchard, Maryland
- Port Orchard, Washington

== Technology ==
- Orchard Project, an open source content management system written in ASP.NET

== See also ==
- Orchard (company), an online smartphone reseller
- Orchard Court, London hotel
- Orchard Library, a Singaporean library on Orchard Road
- Orchard Square, a shopping centre in Sheffield, England
- Plum Orchard, a historic facility listed in the U.S. National Register of Historic Places
- Port Orchard, a strait of the Puget Sound in the state of Washington
- The Orchard (disambiguation)
- Cherry Orchard (disambiguation)
- Crab Orchard (disambiguation)
- Orchard Beach (disambiguation)
- Orchard Lake (disambiguation)
- Orchard Park (disambiguation)
- Orchard Hill (disambiguation)
- Orchard Hills (disambiguation)
