= Crab Orchard =

Crab Orchard may refer to:

== People ==
- Crab Orchard Culture of Mound Builders in prehistoric America

== Places ==
=== United States ===
- Crab Orchard, Illinois
- Crab Orchard, Kentucky
- Crab Orchard, Nebraska
- Crab Orchard, Tennessee
- Crab Orchard, West Virginia
- Crab Orchard Mountains in Tennessee
- Crab Orchard National Wildlife Refuge in Southern Illinois
  - Crab Orchard Lake, located in the Crab Orchard National Wildlife Refuge
  - Crab Orchard Wilderness, located in the Crab Orchard National Wildlife Refuge

== Schools ==
- Crab Orchard Community Unit School District 3 in Southern Illinois

== Railroads ==
- Crab Orchard & Egyptian Railroad

== Others ==
- Crab Orchard Series in Poetry Open Competition Awards
