= Devils Kitchen Lake =

Devil's Kitchen Lake
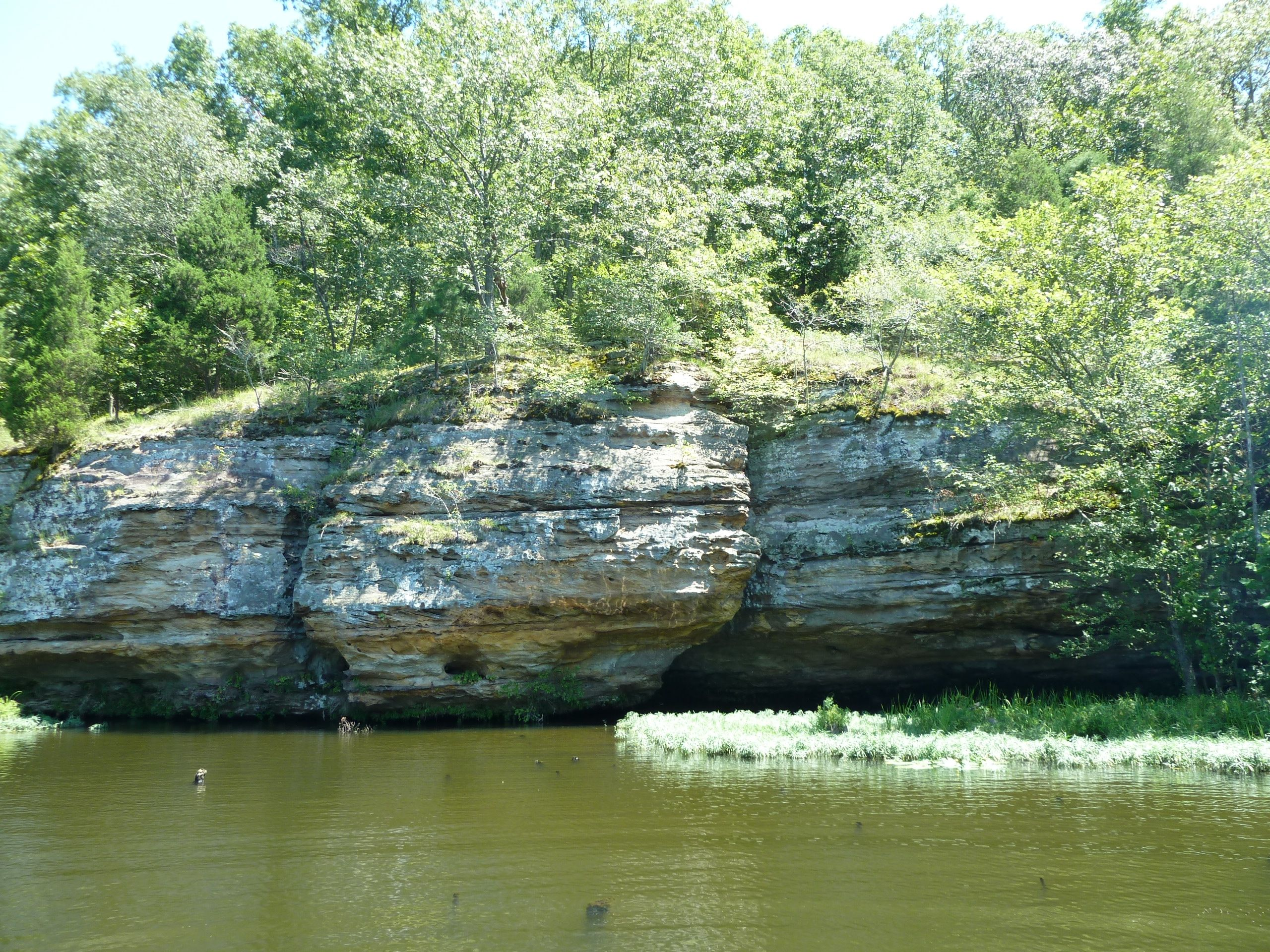
- Devils Kitchen Lake, Crab Orchard National Wildlife Refuge

- Location within Illinois Location within the United States
- Location: Williamson County, Illinois
- Coordinates: 37°37′33″N 89°05′33″W
- Type: reservoir
- Primary inflows: Grassy Creek
- Primary outflows: Grassy Creek
- Basin countries: United States
- Max. length: 4 mi (6.4 km)
- Max. width: 0.25 mi (0.40 km)
- Surface area: 810 acres (330 ha)
- Max. depth: 90 ft (27 m)

Devil's Kitchen Lake is an 810-acre (3.3 km^{2}) reservoir in southern Illinois, created by the damming of Grassy Creek, a tributary of Crab Orchard Lake and the Big Muddy River. Most of the lake is located in Williamson County, southwest of Marion, Illinois. The lake is accessible from Interstate 57. Two arms of the lake penetrate into adjacent Union County. The lake is managed by the U.S. Fish and Wildlife Service.

== Geology and history ==
Devil's Kitchen Lake is located just south of the farthest advance reached by glaciers during the Ice Ages. Instead of being located in the relatively flat, rolling terrain characteristic of most of Illinois, the lake is located in an unglaciated zone of deep sandstone valleys and steep slopes. Devils Kitchen Lake is located in one of these valleys, and it is one of the deepest lakes in Illinois. Sections of the lake are as deep as 90 feet (27 m).

The drainage area surrounding Devil's Kitchen Lake was not very suitable for agriculture and, after being cleared in the early 19th century by frontier settlers, the region drifted out of cultivation. Much of the land was condemned by the federal government during the Great Depression of the 1930s as a form of agricultural readjustment and relief. The Civilian Conservation Corps built Crab Orchard Lake in that decade, and two lakes in Crab Orchard's drainage area, Devils Kitchen Lake and Little Grassy Lake, soon followed it to stabilize water supply to the larger, downstream lake and provide additional recreational opportunities. The drainage area around Devil's Kitchen Lake was allocated to Crab Orchard National Wildlife Refuge, Crab Orchard Wilderness, Panther Den Wilderness, and Shawnee National Forest.

== The lake today ==
The depth of Devil's Kitchen Lake make it a suitable lake for rainbow trout, a cool-water fish that does not thrive in most Illinois waters. Other fish more familiar in Illinois are also found, such as the largemouth bass, bluegill, and crappie. The shores are controlled by the Crab Orchard National Wildlife Refuge, and there are three separate boat-launching areas, on the north end, western shore, and eastern shore. There is a power limit on the lake, with motors restricted to 10 h.p. or less.

Sections of the lake are filled with underwater snags, the stumps of dead trees from the valley forest that once lived where the lake is today. Fishermen are advised to be aware of these snags. Swimming is forbidden in Devils Kitchen Lake.

A fee is required for motor vehicle access to the lake shore.

The nearest interstate exit is Exit 45 on Interstate 57.
