= Orchard (surname) =

Orchard is a surname. Notable people with the surname include:

- Anthony Orchard (1946–), Australian botanist
- Danielle Orchard (1985–), American artist
- Dave Orchard (1948–), South African cricket umpire
- David Orchard (1950–), Canadian politician
- Donald Orchard (1946–), Canadian politician
- Henry John Orchard (1922–2004), American scientist
- John Orchard (1928–1995), American actor
- Julian Orchard (1930–1979), British actor
- Kate Orchard (1923–2025), British veteran
- Len Orchard (1912–unknown), Welsh rugby league footballer who played in the 1930s
- Phil Orchard (1948–2018), New Zealand rugby league footballer
- Robert Orchard, British journalist
- Robert Orchard (rugby league), New Zealand rugby league player
- Tony Orchard (1941–2005), British inorganic chemist
- Wallace Orchard (1890–1917), Canadian ice hockey player
- William Edwin Orchard (1877–1955) British author, minister and Catholic convert
