= A. R. Frank Wazzan =

American academic (1935–2024)

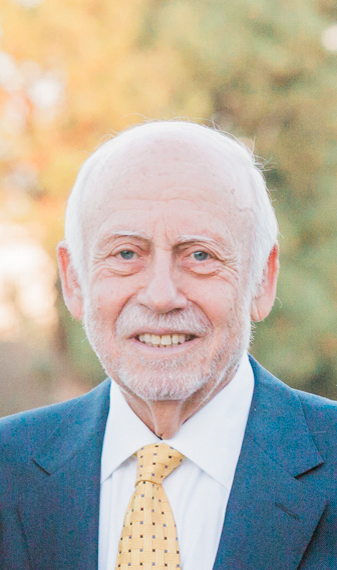
A. R. Frank Wazzan, Ph.D.

A. R. "Frank" Wazzan, Ph.D. (October 17, 1935 – October 1, 2024) was an American-Syrian academic who was Distinguished Professor, and Dean Emeritus, of the Henry Samueli School of Engineering and Applied Science, University of California, Los Angeles ("UCLA"). Wazzan was internationally recognized for his research in the areas of nuclear material, thermal hydraulics, and stability of laminar flows. He was also known for his work on the design of underwater weapons systems for the U.S. Navy, and on the operation of pressurized water nuclear reactors for commercial applications.

== Early life and education ==
Wazzan attended the Presbyterian American Mission School in Latakia, Syria from 1942 to 1952. From October 1953 to March 1954 he attended Frankfurt University, Frankfurt, Germany. In 1955, Wazzan emigrated to the United States (port of entry New York, January 26, 1955). From January 1955 to August 1955 he attended Geneva College, Beaver Falls, Pennsylvania. Wazzan then enrolled at the University of California, Berkeley, which awarded him a bachelor's degree in chemical engineering (1959), a master's in mechanical engineering and aeronautic sciences (1961), and a doctorate in engineering science (1963). Note: Wazzan spent part of '57-58' at UCLA. UC Berkeley Dissertation: The Effect of Dislocation Density and Dislocation Climb on Self Diffusion in Nickel. Dissertation Committee: John E. Dorn (Chairman), Frank Hauser, David Judd, Earl Parker, Maurice Holt.

US Dept. of Defense Security Clearance

== Career ==
Upon completing his doctorate, Wazzan accepted a position as assistant professor at UCLA where he served on the faculty for more than 40 years. He was named Associate Dean in 1981 and Dean of the School of Engineering and Applied Science in 1986, serving in that capacity until 2001. In 1996, Wazzan was instrumental in establishing the graduate degree program in biomedical engineering.

In addition to his academic career, Wazzan served as consultant to Douglas Aircraft, Hughes Electrodynamics, North American Rockwell, the U.S. Atomic Energy Commission, Westinghouse Oceanics Division, the French Atomic Energy Commission, Électricité de France (Visiting Scholar, Office of Commissioner Atomic Energy), Honeywell, and the Department of Defense through the RAND Corporation. In the latter role he was granted secret, top secret, and critical nuclear weapon design information clearances to work on the design of underwater weapon systems, study the effect of nuclear radiation on the performance of electronic materials and communication satellites, and conduct theoretical studies in methods of hardening boosters and satellites to laser and microwave weapons.

== Death ==
Wazzan died on October 1, 2024, at the age of 88.

== Awards and honors ==
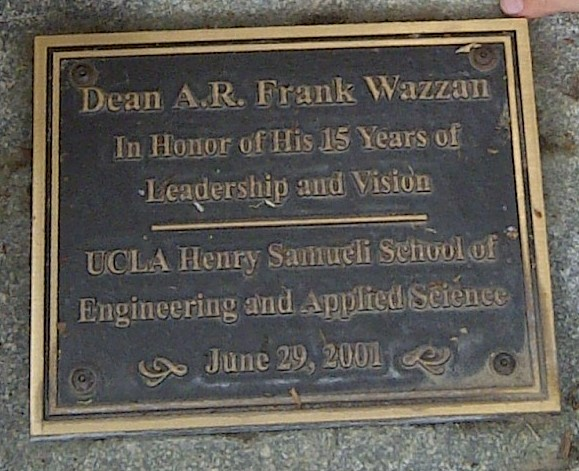
Wazzan Plaque Outside Boelter Hall

Wazzan was the recipient in 1966 of a Guggenheim Fellowship at the University of Copenhagen in Denmark for studies of magnetic interaction in solids.

He was the recipient in 1977 of the "Favorite Professor Award" from the Engineering Society of the University of California.

His paper (with H. Procaccia, and J. David) "Effects of baffling and nonuniform feedwater discharge hole distribution on PWR thermal hydraulics." was awarded "Best Paper" at the Proceedings of International Nuclear Power Plant Thermal Hydraulics and Operations, Taipei City, Taiwan, Republic of China. 1984.

He is recipient of the Gold Medal Award at the First International Meeting on Nuclear Power Plants in Commercial Operations.

Wazzan was an Associate Fellow of the American Institute of Aeronautics and Astronautics. He was a Fellow of the American Nuclear Society.

On June 29, 2001, Wazzan was honored with a tree dedication and plaque permanently mounted outside Boelter Hall, UCLA inscribed "Dean A. R. Frank Wazzan - In Honor of his 15 Years of Leadership and Vision."

== Selected publications ==
1. Wazzan, A. R., and D. Okrent. "Computer simulation of fission gas swelling behavior in carbide fuels." Trans. Am. Nucl. Soc.;(United States) 23 (1976).
2. Wazzan, A. R., and H. Taghavi. "The effect of heat transfer on three-dimensional spatial stability and transition of flat plate boundary layer at mach 3." International Journal of Heat and Mass Transfer 25.9 (1982): 1321–1331.
3. Wazzan, A. R., et al. "Combined effects of pressure gradient and heating on the stability of freon-114 boundary layer." Physics of Fluids 21 (1978): 2141.
4. Wazzan, A. R., et al. "Effect of non-equilibrium fission gas and fuel creep on swelling and release in irradiated carbide fuels." Nuclear Engineering and Design 88.1 (1985): 93–101.
5. Wazzan, A. R., et al. "I. Circulation ratio and carry-under in a PWR steam generator (Bugey-4 nuclear power plant)." Nuclear Engineering and Design 70.2 (1982): 145–158.
6. Wazzan, A. R., H. Procaccia, and J. David. "Thermal-hydraulic characteristics of pressurized water reactors during commercial operation: IV. Saturation pressure, circulation ratio and carry-under in a PWR steam generator (Tricastin 1 nuclear power plant)." Nuclear engineering and design 80.1 (1984): 79–86.
7. Wazzan, A. R., H. Taghavi, and D. Pafford. "Spatial viscous instability of the incompressible Falkner-Skan similarity profile at separation." Physics of Fluids 29 (1986): 2039–2041.
8. Wazzan, A. R., H. Taghavi, and Gerlina Keltner. "The effect of Mach number on the spatial stability of adiabatic flat plate flow to oblique disturbances." Physics of Fluids 27 (1984): 331.
9. Wazzan, A. R., L. B. Robinson, and H. G. Diem. "Heat transfer of gas-particle flow in a supersonic convergent-divergent nozzle." Applied Scientific Research 18.1 (1968): 288–308.
10. Wazzan, A. R., T. Okamura, and A. M. O. Smith. "The Stability of Water Over Heated and Cooled Flat Plates." J. Heat Trans. ASME, Ser. C 90.
11. Wazzan, A. R. "Spatial stability of Tollmien-Schlichting waves." Progress in Aerospace Sciences 16 (1975): 99–127.
12. Wazzan, A. R., A. M. O. Smith, and R. C. Lind. "Mass-Transfer Method of Measuring Wall Shear Stress in Supersonic Flow." Physics of Fluids 8 (1965): 1641.
13. Wazzan, A. R., and John E. Dorn. "Analysis of enhanced diffusivity in nickel." Journal of Applied Physics 36.1 (1965): 222–228.
14. Wazzan, A. R., T. Okamura, and A. M. O. Smith. "The stability of water flow over heated and cooled flat plates." Journal of Heat Transfer 90 (1968): 109.
15. Wazzan, A. R., T. T. Okamura, and A. M. O. Smith. "Stability of laminar boundary layers at separation." Physics of Fluids 10.12 (1967): 2540–2545.
16. Wazzan, A. R., and Lawrence Baylor Robinson. "Elastic constants of magnesium-lithium alloys." Physical Review 155.3 (1967): 586.
17. Wazzan, A. R., M. S. King, and A. A. Ahmediah. "Dilatational Wave Velocities and Dynamic Elastic Moduli of Ni-Mn Alloys." Journal of Applied Physics 36.9 (1965): 2666–2672.
18. Wazzan, A. R., C. Gazley Jr., and A. M. O. Smith "Tolmien-Schlichting Waves and Transition: Heated and Adiabatic Wedge Flows with Application to Bodies of Revolution," Progress in Aerospace Science, Vol. 18, pp. 351–392, 1979.
