= Vijay K. Dhir =

American engineer and researcher

- Born: Giddarbaha, Punjab, India
- Education: University of Kentucky; Punjab Engineering College
- Scientific career
- Fields: Mechanical engineering, Aerospace engineering, Chemical engineering, Biomolecular engineering
- Workplaces: UCLA Henry Samueli School of Engineering and Applied Science

Vijay K. Dhir is the former Dean of the University of California, Los Angeles (UCLA) Henry Samueli School of Engineering and Applied Science, holding the position from March 2003 to January 2016. He is also a professor of mechanical and aerospace engineering, joining the UCLA faculty in 1974. He is the principal investigator of the Boiling eXperiment Facility - Nucleate Pool Boiling eXperiment (BXF-NPBX), which was conducted in micro-g environment on the International Space Station to understand bubble growth, detachment and subsequent motion of single and large merged bubbles boiling in micro-g environment.

Dhir was born in Giddarbaha, in Punjab and raised in India. He received his Bachelor of Science degree from Punjab Engineering College in 1965 and his MTech degree from Indian Institute of Technology in 1968. He obtained his Ph.D. degree in 1972 from the University of Kentucky.

== Career ==
Prior to becoming the dean at the school, Dhir served as vice chair (1988–1991) and chair (1994–2000) of the Department of Mechanical and Aerospace Engineering. Then he served as the school's associate dean for academic and faculty issues and as Interim Dean (2002–2003). He has retired from this position since and is now serving as a professor at UCLA.

Dhir has written or co-authored 3 books and more than 350 papers.

== Honors ==
In 2004, he received the Max Jakob Memorial Award.

In 2006, Dhir was elected a member of the US National Academy of Engineering for work on boiling heat transfer and nuclear reactor thermal-hydraulics and safety. He received the Robert Henry Thurston Lecture Award from the American Society of Mechanical Engineers in 2008.
