= Llewellyn M. K. Boelter =

American engineer (1898–1966)

- Born: Llewellyn Michael Kraus Boelter; August 7, 1898; Winona, Minnesota, U.S.
- Died: July 27, 1966 (aged 67)
- Education: UC Berkeley College of Engineering (BSc, MSc)
- Occupation: Engineer
- Known for: Work with heat transfer
- Parent(s): John Julius Boelter; Clara Carolina Kraus
- Awards: ASME Medal (1957); Max Jakob Memorial Award (1962)

Llewellyn Michael Kraus Boelter (August 7, 1898 – July 27, 1966) was an American engineer, Professor of Mechanical Engineering at the University of California, Los Angeles, and founding Dean of its UCLA Henry Samueli School of Engineering and Applied Science.

In the late 1920s Boelter came into prominence for by his work in the field heat transfer, for which he had investigated heat transfer in the automobile radiator of the tubular type. F. W. Dittus and Boelter proposed "a convective heat transfer correlation for turbulent flows," which became known as the Dittus-Boelter equation. In 1957 he was awarded the ASME Medal.

== Biography ==
=== Early life and education ===
Boelter was born Winona, Minnesota in 1898, son of John Julius Boelter and Clara Carolina (Kraus) Boelter. His ancestors had "endured the ravages of Indian attacks and had served in the battles of the Civil War," which triggered an early and lasting interest in American history.

After regular education in the states of Minnesota and Washington, Boelter obtained his BSc in 1917 at the College of Mechanics of the University of California, Berkeley, now UC Berkeley College of Engineering, and his MSc in Electrical Engineering in 1918. In 1917 he had been awarded a John W. Mackay, Jr., Fellowship in Electrical Engineering to make this happen.

=== Career and acknowledgement ===
In 1919 Boelter started his academic career at the University of California, Berkeley as instructor in electrical engineering in the Department of Mechanical Engineering. In 1923 he became assistant professor of experimental engineering, in 1927 to associate professor of mechanical engineering, and in 1934 he was appointed full professor. In 1943 Boelter served as associate dean of engineering at Berkeley, and in 1944 became founding dean of its college of engineering, the UCLA Henry Samueli School of Engineering and Applied Science.

Boelter was awarded the Lamme Award by the American Society for Engineering Education (ASEE), the ASME Medal by the American Society of Mechanical Engineers (ASME) in 1957, and the Max Jakob Memorial Award by the American Institute of Chemical Engineers (AICC) and the ASME. Purdue University awarded him the honorary degree of Doctor of Engineering.

== Selected publications ==
- Boelter, Llewellyn Michael Kraus, G. Young, and H. W. Iversen. An investigation of aircraft heaters. University of California, Department of Engineering, 1946.
- Boelter, L. M. K., G. Young, and H. W. Iversen. An Investigation of Aircraft Heaters XXVII: Distribution of Heat-transfer Rate in the Entrance Section of a Circular Tube. NACA Technical Note No. 1451, 1948.
- Boelter, Llewellyn Michael Kraus. Heat transfer notes. Univ of California Press, 1948.
- Seifert, Howard S., and Llewellyn Michael Kraus Boelter, eds. Space Technology. Vol. 1. Wiley, 1959.

=== Articles, a selection ===
- F.W. Dittus, L.M.K. Boelter. "Heat transfer in automobile radiator Radiator of the tubular type," University of California at Berkeley Publ. Eng., 2 (1930), pp. 443–461
- Martinelli, R. C., Boelter, L. M. K., Weinberg, E. B., & Yakahi, S. (1943). "Heat transfer to a fluid flowing periodically at low frequencies in a vertical tube." Trans. Asme, 65(7), 789-798.
- Boelter, L. M. K., HSj Gordon, and J. R. Griffin. "Free evaporation into air of water from a free horizontal quiet surface." Industrial & Engineering Chemistry 38.6 (1946): 596-600.
