= UCLA Samueli School of Engineering =

School of engineering at the University of California, Los Angeles

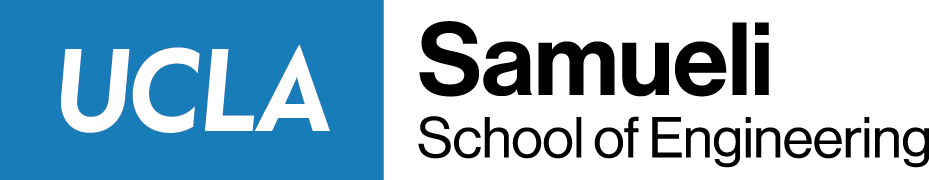
- Other names: UCLA Henry Samueli School of Engineering and Applied Science
- Type: Engineering school
- Established: 1945
- Parent institution: University of California, Los Angeles
- Dean: Alissa Park
- Faculty: 191 (2022)
- Students: 6,584 (2021)
- Undergraduates: 4,081 (2021)
- Postgraduates: 2,503 (2021)
- Doctoral students: 1,117 (2021)
- Location: Los Angeles, California, U.S. 34.0688°N 118.4443°W
- Website: samueli.ucla.edu

The UCLA Samueli School of Engineering is the engineering school of the University of California, Los Angeles (UCLA). It opened as the College of Engineering in 1945 and was renamed the School of Engineering in 1969.

Since its initial enrollment of 379 students, the school has grown to approximately 6,500 students. The school offers 28 degree programs and is home to eight externally funded interdisciplinary research centers, including those in space exploration, wireless sensor systems, and nanotechnology.

== History ==
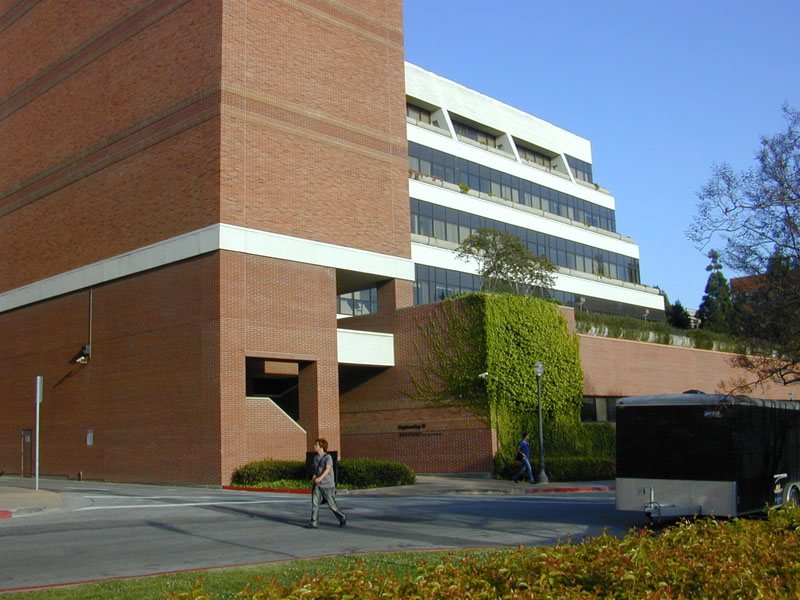
Engineering IV building

The school was renamed for its alumnus and Professor Henry Samueli, who received his B.S. (1975), M.S. (1976), and Ph.D. (1980) in Electrical Engineering there. Samueli is co-founder, chairman, and chief technology officer of Broadcom Corporation and a philanthropist in the Orange County community. He and his wife Susan donated US$30 million to the school in 1999. It was at UCLA that Henry Nicholas and Henry Samueli met and later formed Broadcom.

The school is credited as the birthplace of the Internet, where the first message was sent to a computer at Stanford University on October 29, 1969, by Professor Leonard Kleinrock and his research team at UCLA. On September 29, 2008, President George W. Bush presented the 2007 National Medal of Science to Kleinrock for "his fundamental contributions to the mathematical theory of modern data networks, and for the functional specification of packet switching, which is the foundation of Internet technology. His mentoring of generations of students has led to the commercialization of technologies that have transformed the world." Room 3420 at Boelter Hall, where the first message was sent, has been converted into The Kleinrock Internet Heritage Site and Archive (renamed KIHC – The Kleinrock Internet History Center at UCLA).

UCLA conferred its first Bachelor of Science degree in engineering in 1947, its first Master of Science degree in 1948, and its first Doctor of Philosophy degree in 1950. Annual Engineering commencement ceremonies are held in June at Pauley Pavilion.

== Campus ==
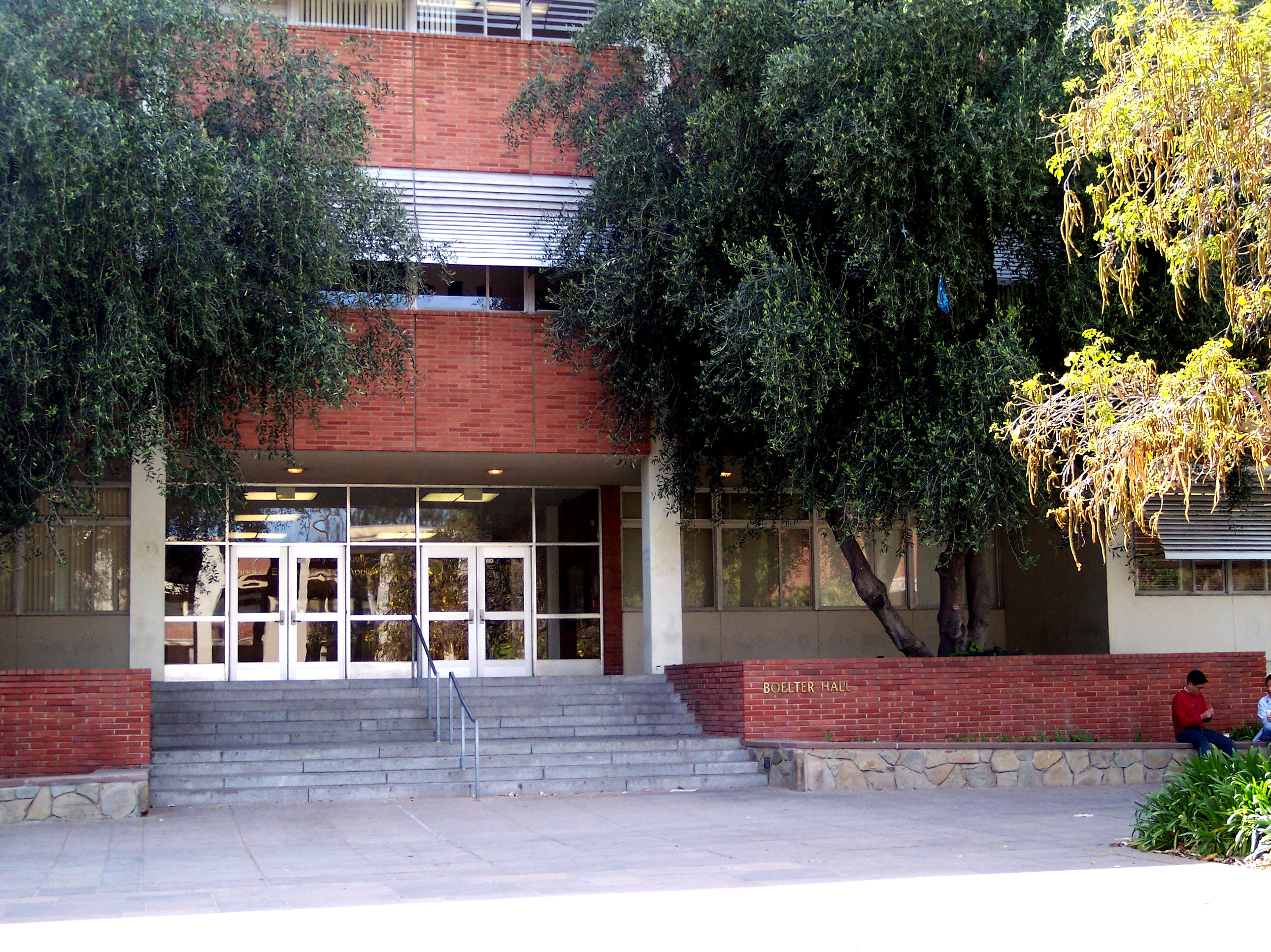
Entrance to Boelter Hall

The main building is Boelter Hall (Engineering II and III), named after Llewellyn M. K. Boelter, a Mechanical Engineering professor at UC Berkeley who became the first Dean of the school. He "often took an active role in the lives of the school's students, and his approach to engineering impacted many of their careers," according to the school. He retired in 1965 and was succeeded by Chauncey Starr, a pioneer in nuclear power development.

HSSEAS is housed in two other buildings: Engineering IV, and Engineering V, which houses the Department of Bioengineering and the Department of Materials Science and Engineering. Engineering I was demolished in August 2011, to be replaced by Engineering VI, which houses the Western Institute of Nanotechnology on Green Engineering and Metrology (WIN-GEM) in 2014. The ground breaking ceremony for Engineering VI building was held October 26, 2012 with Congressman Henry A. Waxman and Henry Samueli. On March 19, 2015, Engineering VI phase I was dedicated and phase II broke ground with the help of James L. Easton, class of '59 alumnus. Engineering VI was completed and opened in 2018.

== Academics ==
=== Departments ===
The Samueli School of Engineering has seven departments and one interdepartmental program, which are accredited by the Accreditation Board for Engineering and Technology (ABET). The school offers the following degrees:

Program	B.S.	M.S.	Ph.D.	Other
Aerospace Engineering	*	*	*	
Bioengineering	*	*	*	
Chemical Engineering	*	*	*	
Computer Engineering	*			
Civil Engineering	*	*	*	
Computer Science	*	*	*	
Computer Science and Engineering	*			
Electrical Engineering	*	*	*	
Engineering		*		1
Engineering and Applied Science				2
Manufacturing Engineering		*		
Materials Engineering	*			
Materials Science and Engineering		*	*	
Mechanical Engineering	*	*	*	

1. Online M.S. Degree
2. Graduate Certificate of Specialization

=== Undergraduate admissions ===
For Fall 2015 admitted students had a median weighted grade point average (GPA) of 4.5 and a median SAT score of 2190.

For Fall 2019, UCLA Engineering received 25,804 freshman applications and admitted 2,505 for an admission rate of 9.7%.

For Fall 2020, UCLA Engineering received 24,039 freshman applications and admitted 2,640 for an admission rate of 11.0%.

For Fall 2022, admitted students had a median unweighted grade point average (GPA) of 4.00, a median weighted GPA of 4.59, and a median SAT score of 1540.

For Fall 2024, UCLA Engineering received 35,057 freshman applications and admitted 1,875 for an admission rate of 5.3%.

== People ==
=== Alumni ===
Winners of the UCLA Engineering Alumni of the Year award

Name	Degrees	Distinctions
Ahmadreza Rofougaran	B.S. '86, M.S. '88, Ph.D. ’98	Pioneering RF CMOS & mmWave Radios, Co-founder of Movandi Corporation and Innovent System Inc
Paul Baran	M.S. ’59	Internet Pioneer (1926 - 2011)
Aaron S. Cohen	’58	Vice Chairman and Founder, National Technical Systems
Linda P.B. Katehi	M.S. '81, Ph.D. '84	Awarded for "distinguishing herself in both academia and in integrated circuits and systems." (Former Provost and Vice Chancellor of UIUC, Former Chancellor of UC Davis)
Henry T. Nicholas III	Ph.D. '98	Co-founder of Broadcom Corporation
Asad M. Madni	M.S. '72	
Vint Cerf	M.S. '57, Ph.D. '70	Google Internet Evangelist, creator of TCP/IP
Dwight Streit	Ph.D. '86	
Henry Samueli	Ph.D. '80	Co-founder of Broadcom Corporation
Jack S. Gordon	M.E. '76	
Ronald D. Sugar	Ph.D. '71	Former Chairman and CEO of Northrop Grumman
Robert F. Graham	B.S. '55	
Richard S. Simonsen	B.S. '55	
Peter Staudhammer	(?) '55, Ph.D. '57	NASA Distinguished Public Service Medalist, 2002 (1935 - 2008)
John (Jack) F. Gifford	B.S. '63	Co-founder of AMD and Maxim Integrated Products (1941 - 2009)
Gerald A. Johnston	M.S. '72	
James L. Easton	B.S. '59	Chairman and CEO of Jas. D. Easton Inc., now merged into Easton-Bell Sports
Edsel D. Dunford	M.E. '73	
Eugene C. Gritton	Ph.D. '66	
John F. Cashen	Ph.D. '71	
Edward P. Smith	B.S. '57	
Russell R. O'Neill	Ph.D. '56	Dean Emeritus (1916 - 2007)
Ben Rich	M.S. '50	
Brien D. Ward	Ph.D. '67	
Sam F. Iacobellis	M.S. '63	
Gary E. MacDougal	B.S. '58	
John B. Slaughter	Ph.D. '71	
Robert N. Parker	M.S. '56	
Leonard F. Buchanan	Ph.D. '68	
Jacob B. Frankel	Ph.D. '51	
Paul D. Castenholz	M.S. '58	
Norman E. Friedmann	Ph.D. '57	
Myron Tribus	Ph.D. '49	
Robert Bromberg	Ph.D. '51	
Ralph E. Crump	B.S. '50	
Raymond M. Hill	B.S. '55	
Trude C. Taylor	B.S. '49	(? - 2008)
Armond Hairapetian	B.S. '87, M.S. '88, Ph.D. '93	
Josephine M. Cheng	B.S. '75, M.S. '77	
B. John Garrick	MS '62, PhD '68	
Joanne M. Maguire	MS ’78	Former executive Vice President of Lockheed Martin Space Systems between 2006 and 2013
Tyson Tuttle	Ms '92	Former Chief Executive Officer, Silicon Labs, 2012 to 2022

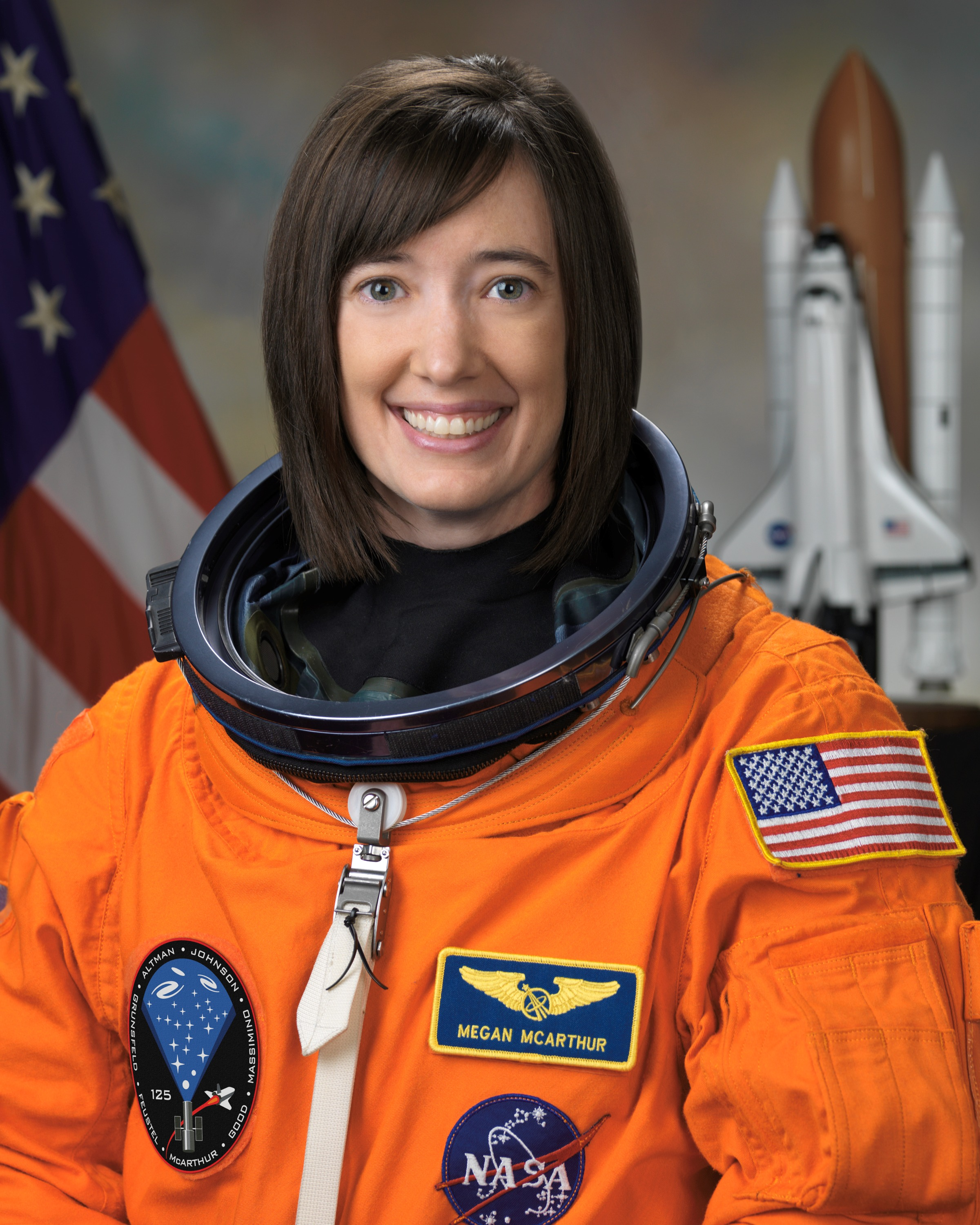
K. Megan McArthur, ’93

- Allen Adham ’90: co-founder of Blizzard Entertainment
- Michael Morhaime ’90: co-founder of Blizzard Entertainment
- Frank Pearce ’90: co-founder of Blizzard Entertainment
- James Collins ’50: founder of Sizzler
- Chris “Jesus” Ferguson ’86, Ph.D. ’99: professional poker player
- Klein Gilhousen ’69: co-inventor of CDMA technology and co-founder of Qualcomm
- Blake Krikorian ’90: founder of Sling Media
- K. Megan McArthur, ’93: NASA astronaut
- James D. Plummer ’66, M.S. ’67, Ph.D. ’71: Dean of Stanford University School of Engineering

=== List of deans ===
- Llewellyn M.K. Boelter, 1944-1965
- Chauncey Starr, 1967–1973
- Russell R. O'Neill, 1974–1983
- George L. Turin, 1983–1986
- A.R. Frank Wazzan, 1986–2001
- Vijay K. Dhir, 2003–2015
- Jayathi Murthy, 2016–2022
- Bruce Dunn, 2022–2023 (interim)
- Ah-Hyung "Alissa" Park, 2023–present

=== Faculty ===
Faculty members: 164

National Academy of Engineering members: 28

Faculty distinctions:

Name	Department	Distinctions
Asad Ali Abidi	Electrical Engineering	CMOS RF circuits, National Academy of Engineering
Birgitte Ahring	Civil and Environmental Engineering	First woman to receive the Villum Kann Rasmussen Award
Mau-Chung Frank Chang	Electrical Engineering	Semiconductor materials, RF circuits, National Academy of Engineering
Thomas Connolly (1923 – 2006)	Nuclear Engineering	American Nuclear Society
Vijay K. Dhir	Mechanical and Aerospace Engineering	National Academy of Engineering
Deborah Estrin	Computer Science	National Academy of Engineering
Thelma Estrin	Computer Science	Women in Technology International's Hall of Fame
Sheila Greibach	Computer Science	Greibach normal form
Chih-Ming Ho	Mechanical and Aerospace Engineering	National Academy of Engineering
Tatsuo Itoh	Electrical Engineering	National Academy of Engineering
Leonard Kleinrock	Computer Science	Internet pioneer, 2007 National Medal of Science
Alan Kay	Computer Science	2003 Turing Award
John Kim	Mechanical and Aerospace Engineering	National Academy of Engineering
Tung Hua Lin (1911 – 2007)	Civil and Environmental Engineering	China's first twin engine aircraft, National Academy of Engineering
David Okrent (1922 – 2012)	Mechanical and Aerospace Engineering	Nuclear Reactor Safety, National Academy of Engineering
Henry John Orchard (1922 – 2004)	Electrical Engineering	Filter design
Judea Pearl	Computer Science	Bayesian network, 2012 Turing Award, National Academy of Sciences, National Academy of Engineering
Jason Speyer	Mechanical and Aerospace Engineering	National Academy of Engineering
Demetri Terzopoulos	Computer Science	2006 Academy Award, Royal Society of London, Royal Society of Canada, European Academy of Sciences

== See also ==
- History of the Internet
- University of California, Los Angeles
