= Spawning bed =

Underwater surface on which fish deposit their eggs

A spawning bed is an underwater solid surface on which fish spawn to reproduce themselves.

In fishery management, a spawning bed is an artificial bed constructed by wildlife professionals in order to improve the ability of desired game fish to reproduce. Increasing the spawning ability of a fish population may reduce pressure on a fishery and improve the productivity of supplemental stocking from fish hatcheries.

In the inland waters of North America, a typical spawning bed will consist of a series of concrete boxes filled with aggregate gravel. The concept is credited to the Kentucky Department of Fish and Wildlife.

In a typical example of spawning beds in action, the Illinois Department of Natural Resources has installed approximately 50 largemouth bass spawning beds in Crab Orchard Lake in southern Illinois.

In some cases, especially in salt water, an artificial structure may significantly alter underwater morphology and create an artificial reef. Some vessels have been deliberately sunken, especially in salt water, in order to provide a destination for divers. In some of these cases the artificial reef also serves a supplemental purpose as a spawning bed.

== See also ==
- Artificial reef
- Spawning ground
