= Crab Orchard Wilderness =

Protected wilderness area in Illinois, United States

- IUCN category Ib (wilderness area)
- Location within Illinois Location within the United States
- Location: Williamson, Union and Jackson Counties, Illinois
- Nearest city: Carbondale, Illinois
- Coordinates: 37°36′15″N 89°05′17″W
- Area: 4,050 acres (16.4 km^{2})
- Designated: 1976
- Governing body: United States Fish and Wildlife Service

The Crab Orchard Wilderness is a 4,050-acre (16.4 km^{2}) parcel of land listed as a Wilderness Area of the United States. It is located within the Crab Orchard National Wildlife Refuge in Williamson, Union, and Jackson counties in Illinois.

== Second-growth wilderness ==
As with other wilderness areas in southern Illinois, the Crab Orchard Wilderness is made of second-growth forested areas that were used, until the land condemnations of the 1930s, as agriculture and pasture land. The United States Fish and Wildlife Service manages the wilderness.

The Crab Orchard Wilderness is a roadless parcel of land within a national wildlife refuge. Together with the adjacent Panther Den Wilderness, it forms part of the southern shore of Devils Kitchen Lake.

The Crab Orchard Wilderness is accessible by several paved highways. The nearest divided highway is Interstate 57, which passes through the nearby city of Marion, Illinois.
