= Chih-Ming Ho =

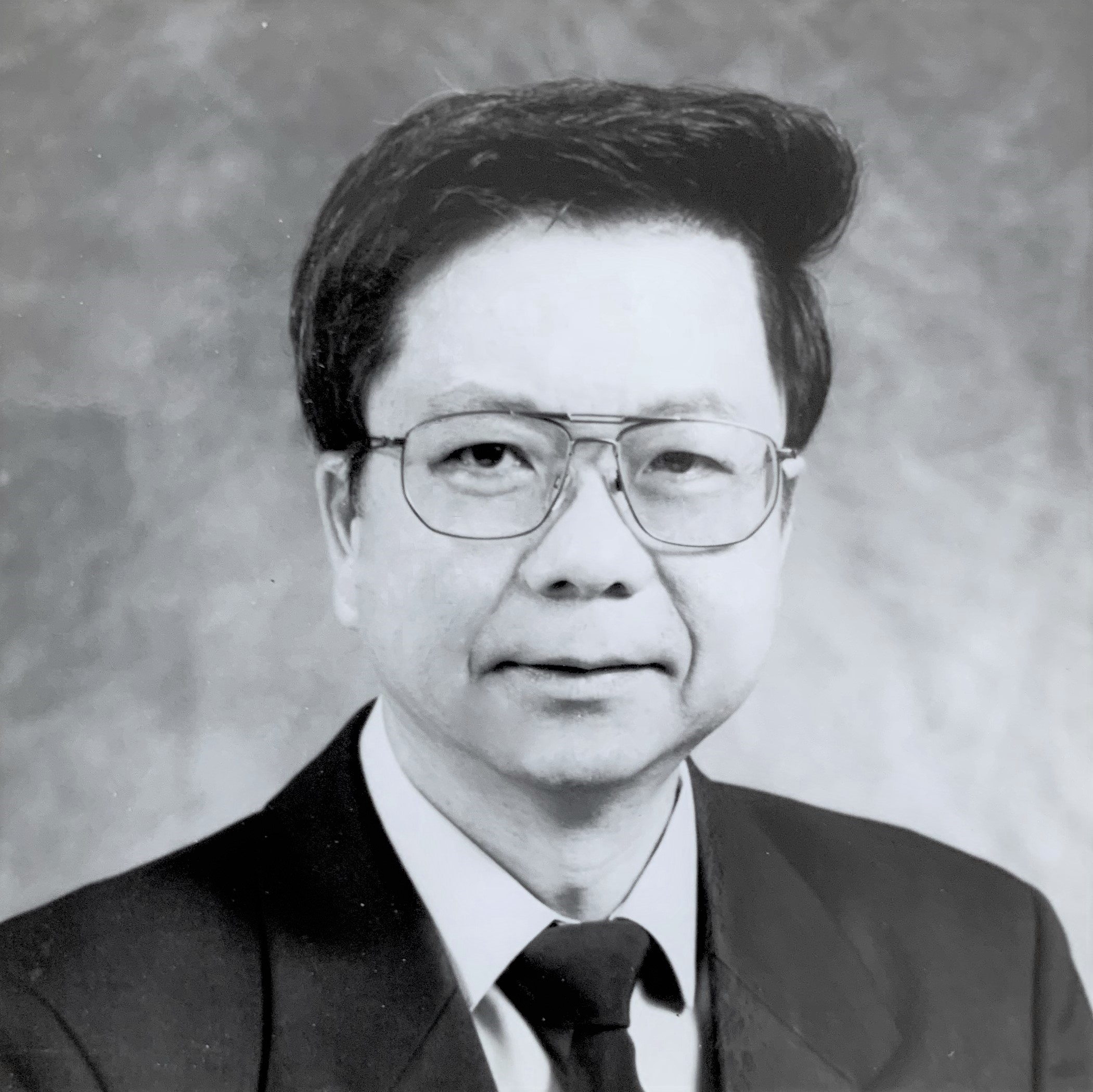
- Born: 1945 (age 80–81)
- Education: National Taiwan University, Johns Hopkins University
- Engineering career
- Discipline: AI-Medicine, Microfluidics, Turbulence
- Institutions: University of California, Los Angeles

Chih-Ming Ho (何志明) is an engineering professor in interdisciplinary fields, which span from aerodynamics to AI-medicine. He received a B.S. in Mechanical Engineering from National Taiwan University in 1967 and a Ph.D. in Mechanics and Material Sciences from Johns Hopkins University in 1974.

In 1997, Ho was elected as a member of the National Academy of Engineering for contributions to the understanding and control of turbulent flows.

== Academic career ==
Dr. Chih-Ming Ho started his career at the University of Southern California (USC) in 1975 and rose to the rank of full professor. In 1991, he moved to the University of California, Los Angeles to lead the university's establishment of the micro-electro-mechanical-system (MEMS) field, while serving as the founding Director of the Center for Micro Systems. He is the Ben Rich-Lockheed Martin Professor Emeritus. Ho was the Director of the NASA-supported Institute for Cell Mimetic Space Exploration and the NIH-supported Center for Cell Control at the UCLA Henry Samueli School of Engineering and Applied Science. He served as UCLA Associate Vice Chancellor for Research from 2001 to 2005.

== Research accomplishments ==
=== Control of turbulent flows ===
Ho was the first to introduce the idea of actively perturbing the free shear layer with subharmonics of its Kelvin-Helmholtz instability frequency for increasing the entrainment of the ambient fluid into the jet stream^{[2,3]}. Furthermore, with an elliptic jet of a small aspect ratio, he found that the entrainment of the elliptic jet can be up to five times higher than that of a round jet at a passive control mode^{[4]}. Ho applied micro shear stress sensor arrays to detect the turbulent separation line at the leading edge of the airfoil and used micro actuators to produce asymmetric separation vortices, such that the aircraft can be maneuvered in rolling, pitching and yawing modes^{[5,6]}. These innovative flow control technologies made him a global front-runner in aerodynamics during the 1980s.

=== Microfluidics ===
In early 1990s, Ho was among the pioneers of studying flows inside microfluidic channels^{[7,8]} and micro bio-molecular sensors^{[9,10]}. Microfluidic devices are in the dimension of microns, which match the cell sizes, such that only a minute amount of biosample is needed for analysis. With surface molecular modifications, amperometric sensors can detect DNA/RNA even without PCR amplification in the 2000s^{[9]}. In addition, because the electrokinetic forces also work in the micro/nano scale range, it became possible to detect single molecules in microfluidic device^{[10]}. These bio-marker sensors can have ultrasensitivity in body fluids, blood, saliva, and urine^{[11]}.

=== AI personalized medicine ===
Almost all diseases are treated by combinatorial drugs. However, M drugs with N doses for each drug constitute a huge search space of N^{M} possible combinations. In addition, the interactions among drug molecules and omics mechanisms are an insurmountable maze. Around 2010, Ho applied the mechanism independent artificial intelligence analysis and discovered that drug-dose inputs are correlated with phenotypic outputs with a Phenotypic Response Surface (PRS)^{[12,13,14,16,17,18]}, which is governed by second-order polynomial type function. The coefficients of the PRS function can be determined by a small number of calibration tests. Hence, the AI-PRS function in turn eliminates the need for big data training set for AI analysis, which is not feasible in in vivo tests, especially in clinical settings. AI-PRS is an indication agnostic and mechanism free platform technology, which has been successfully demonstrated in about 30 diseases, including clinical trials of cancers^{[15]}, infectious diseases^{[20]} and organ transplants^{[19]}. The AI-PRS platform can realize unprecedented levels of adaptability to identify the optimized drug combination for a specific patient, even if dynamic changes to the regimen and dose/drug optimization are needed on a continuous basis^{[15,19,20]}.

== Honors and awards ==
Ho was ranked by Thomson Reuters ISI as one of the top 250 most cited researchers in all engineering categories (2001-2014). In 1997, Dr. Ho was inducted as a member of the National Academy of Engineering. In the next year, he was elected as an Academician of Academia Sinica. Ho has received a Doctor of Engineering Honoris Causa from Hong Kong University of Science and Technology and he holds ten honorary professorships, including the Einstein Professorship from the Chinese Academy of Sciences. Ho was elected a Fellow of American Physics Society, American Association for the Advancement of Science, American Institute for Medical and Biological Engineering and American Institute of Aeronautics and Astronautics.

Services in Professional Communities

In services to professional societies. Ho was a Chair of the Division of Fluid Dynamics (DFD) for the American Physical Society, which is the platform in the United States for scientists interested in fundamental fluid dynamics. He was on the advisory board for the AIAA Journal and is a member of the IEEE/ASME coordinating Committee of Journal of MEMS. He was an Associate Editor of the ASME Journal of Fluids Engineering and an Associate Editor of the AIAA Journal. He also has served as a Guest Editor for the Annual Review of Fluid Dynamics. He also has chaired or served on many advisory or organizing committees of international conferences on high technology topics.

Ho has served on advisory panels to provide assistance to the US, China, France, Hong Kong, Israel, Japan, Korea, Switzerland, Taiwan, Thailand, and the United Kingdom, on the developments of nano/micro technologies.

== Industrial participation ==
Ho is a co-founder of GeneFluidics, which specializes in rapid PCR-less molecular based identification of pathogen-specific sequence. He is also a co-founder of Kyan Therapeutics, which specializes in AI driven drug development/dosage optimization.
