= The Orchard =

The Orchard may refer to:

== Music ==
- The Orchard (band), Canadian country music duo
- The Orchard (company), American music and entertainment company
- The Orchard (Lizz Wright album), 2008
- The Orchard (Ra Ra Riot album), 2010

== Places ==
- James L. Breese House, a historic home in Southampton, New York
- The Orchard (tea room), a tea room and tea garden in Grantchester, near Cambridge, England

== Other uses ==
- The Orchard (development), tallest building in Queens, New York City
- The Orchard, a 2022 play based on Anton Chekhov's 1903 play The Cherry Orchard

== See also ==
- Orchard (disambiguation)
