= Alissa Park =

Korean chemical engineer

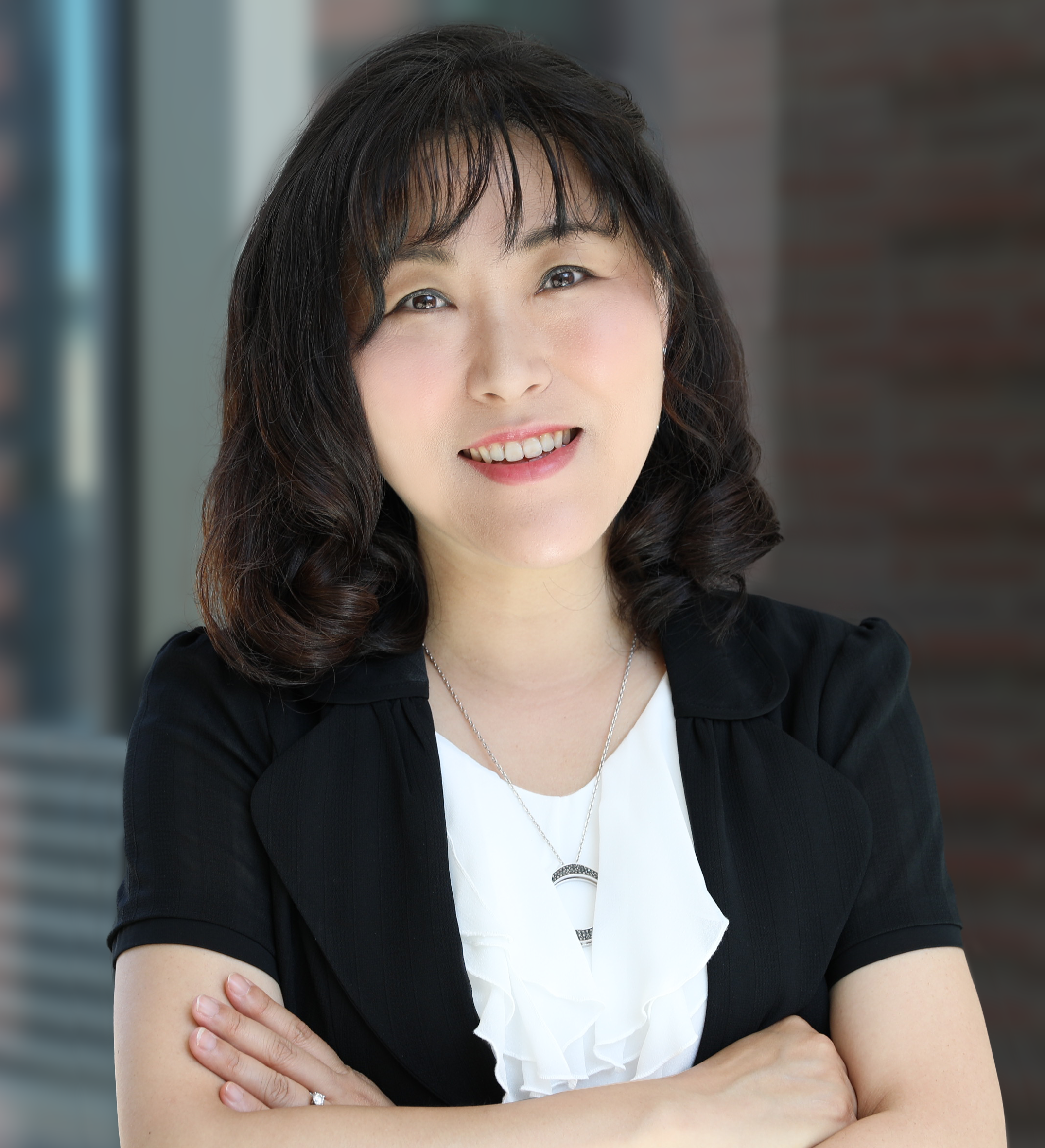
- Park in 2023

Dean of UCLA Henry Samueli School of Engineering and Applied Science
- Incumbent
- Assumed office September 1, 2023
- Preceded by: Jayathi Murthy

Personal details
- Education: University of British Columbia (BS and MS); Ohio State University (PhD)
- Scientific career
- Fields: Chemical Engineering, Sustainability Engineering, Environmental Engeineering
- Workplaces: Columbia University; University of California, Los Angeles

Ah-Hyung “Alissa” Park is a chemical engineer and an expert on sustainable energy and materials conversion focusing on carbon capture, utilization and storage (CCUS) technologies and atmospheric carbon dioxide removal. Originally from South Korea, and educated in Canada and the U.S., she is the Ronald and Valerie Sugar Dean of the UCLA Henry Samueli School of Engineering and Applied Science where she is also a professor of chemical and biomolecular engineering, with a joint appointment in civil and environmental engineering.

== Early life and education ==
Park was born in Seoul, South Korea, to Jin Park, an architectural engineer, and Heesup Yoon, an artist. She has two younger brothers, Jae-Hyung Park and Si-Hyung Park. She studied chemical and biological engineering at the University of British Columbia in Canada, earning bachelor's and master's degrees there in 1998 and 2000, and completed a Ph.D. in chemical and biomolecular engineering in 2005 at the Ohio State University. Her master's degree advisors were professors John R. Grace and Xiaotao Tony Bi. Park's PhD dissertation, Carbon dioxide sequestration: Chemical and physical activation of aqueous carbonation of Mg-bearing minerals and pH swing process, was supervised by professor Liang-Shih Fan.

== Career ==
In 2007, Park became the Lenfest Junior Professor in Applied Climate Science and the associate director of the Lenfest Center for Sustainable Energy at Columbia University, in the Department of Earth and Environmental Engineering and the Department of Chemical Engineering. She became full professor, director of the center, and chair of the Earth and Environmental Engineering Department before moving in 2023 to her present position as the Ronald and Valerie Sugar Dean of the Henry Samueli School of Engineering and Applied Science at the University of California, Los Angeles.

Park leads a research team that aims to advance the scientific understanding of sustainable energy and materials conversion pathways to address climate change. Her current research focuses on developing novel nanomaterials to capture carbon dioxide and convert it to useful fuels or chemicals, as well as CO_{2} utilization and storage based on unique carbonate chemistry involving silicate minerals while recovering valuable materials, such as rare earth elements.

She is also working on a new concept of urban mining to recover metals such as copper and gold and energy from electronic and industrial wastes (e.g., ashes from waste-to-energy plants and slags from steelmaking plants) through green chemistry. Founded on these new materials and reaction schemes, her group creates highly integrated fuel synthesis pathways using unconventional energy sources including marine biomass while minimizing environmental impacts. Her research on the combined capture and conversion of CO_{2} to dense energy carriers provides long-term energy storage potential needed for long-term renewable energy systems.

Park is a notable figure in advancing science and engineering research toward zero-carbon emission goals, with a focus on women's involvement in STEM. She was a co-chair of the 2017 Mission Innovation workshop on CCUS and served as a member of the National Academies' committee on CO_{2} utilization from 2022 to 2025. At Columbia University, she worked with UN Women on entrepreneurship in sustainable energy in developing countries.

== Recognition ==
Park is a fellow of the American Chemical Society, American Institute of Chemical Engineers (AIChE), Royal Society of Chemistry, Canadian Institute for Advanced Research, and American Association for the Advancement of Science.

She is the recipient of the 2025 KSEA Engineer of the Year Award, the 2025 American Chemical Society Energy and Fuels Division's (ACS ENFL) Distinguished Researcher Award, the 2025 The Engineers’ Council's Distinguished Engineering Educator Award, and the 2025 International Union of Pure and Applied Chemistry (IUPAC) Distinguished Women in Chemistry or Chemical Engineering Award. Her other awards include the 2022 AIChE Shell Thomas Baron Award in Fluid-Particle Systems, 2022 ACS ENFL Mid-Career Researcher Award, the 2021 Ohio State University's Distinguished Alumni Award for Academic Excellence, the 2018 U.S. C3E Research Award, the 2018 ACS ENFL Emerging Researcher Award, the 2017 ACS Women's Chemical Committee Rising Star Award and a 2009 National Science Foundation CAREER Award.
