= Cherry Orchard =

Cherry Orchard may refer to:

- The Cherry Orchard, a play by Anton Chekhov.
  - The Cherry Orchard (1974 film), an adaptation on Australian television, starring Googie Withers
  - The Cherry Orchard (1981 film), an adaptation on British television, starring Judi Dench
  - The Cherry Orchard (1990 film), a Japanese manga series about a production of the play
  - The Cherry Orchard (1999 film), an international coproduction of the play, starring Charlotte Rampling
- A cherry orchard, for the cultivation of cherries
- Cherry Orchard, Dublin, Ireland, a suburb
  - Cherry Orchard F.C., an association football club in the Dublin suburb
  - Park West and Cherry Orchard railway station, in the Dublin suburb
- Cherry Orchard Bog Natural Area Preserve, a natural area preserve in Virginia
- Cherryorchard, the name of two townlands in Ireland; see List of townlands of County Wexford

== See also ==
- Orchard (disambiguation)
