= Orchard Beach =

Orchard Beach may refer to:

- Orchard Beach, Maryland, a populated place on a tidal river
- Orchard Beach, Michigan, an unincorporated community
- Orchard Beach State Park, Michigan, on Lake Michigan
- Orchard Beach, Bronx, New York, a beach on Long Island Sound

== See also ==
- Old Orchard Beach, Maine, a town on the Gulf of Maine
