= Earl R. Parker =

American metallurgy professor (1912–1998)

Earl Randall Parker (November 22, 1912 — May 9, 1998) was an American engineer and professor. Parker began his metallurgy career in the mid 1930s as a researcher for the General Electric Research Laboratory. In the mid 1940s, Parker began teaching metallurgy at the University of California, Berkeley and remained in his teaching position until 1978. While at Berkeley, Parker was chair of the material sciences department and director of engineering research between the 1950s and 1960s. For awards, Parker received a Guggenheim Fellowship in 1960 and was named a National Medal of Science recipient in 1979.

== Early life and education ==
On November 22, 1912, Parker was born in Denver, Colorado. For his post-secondary education, Parker graduated from the Colorado School of Mines with a metallurgy degree in 1935.

== Career ==
After graduating, Parker was a metallurgy researcher at the General Electric Research Laboratory from 1935 to 1944. During this time period, Parker conducted research on copper, silver and steel to determine their mechanical properties. In 1944, Parker studied Liberty ships at the University of California, Berkeley to determine the cause of their damages. During the mid-1940s, Parker began teaching metallurgy at Berkeley as an associate professor before being promoted to professor in 1949. Parker remained at Berkeley as a professor until his retirement in 1978 and held the position of professor emeritus from 1978 to 1988. Apart from academics, Parker was the chair of the material sciences department for Berkeley from 1953 to 1957. After directing Berkeley's school of engineering research between 1957 and 1964, Parker returned to his chair position with the material sciences department for two additional years.

== Awards and honors ==
In 1960, Parker was awarded a Guggenheim Fellowship in engineering. In 1979, Parker was named a recipient of the National Medal of Science.

== Personal life ==
Parker died on May 9, 1998, in Sacramento, California. He was married and had two children.
