= Crab Orchard Lake =

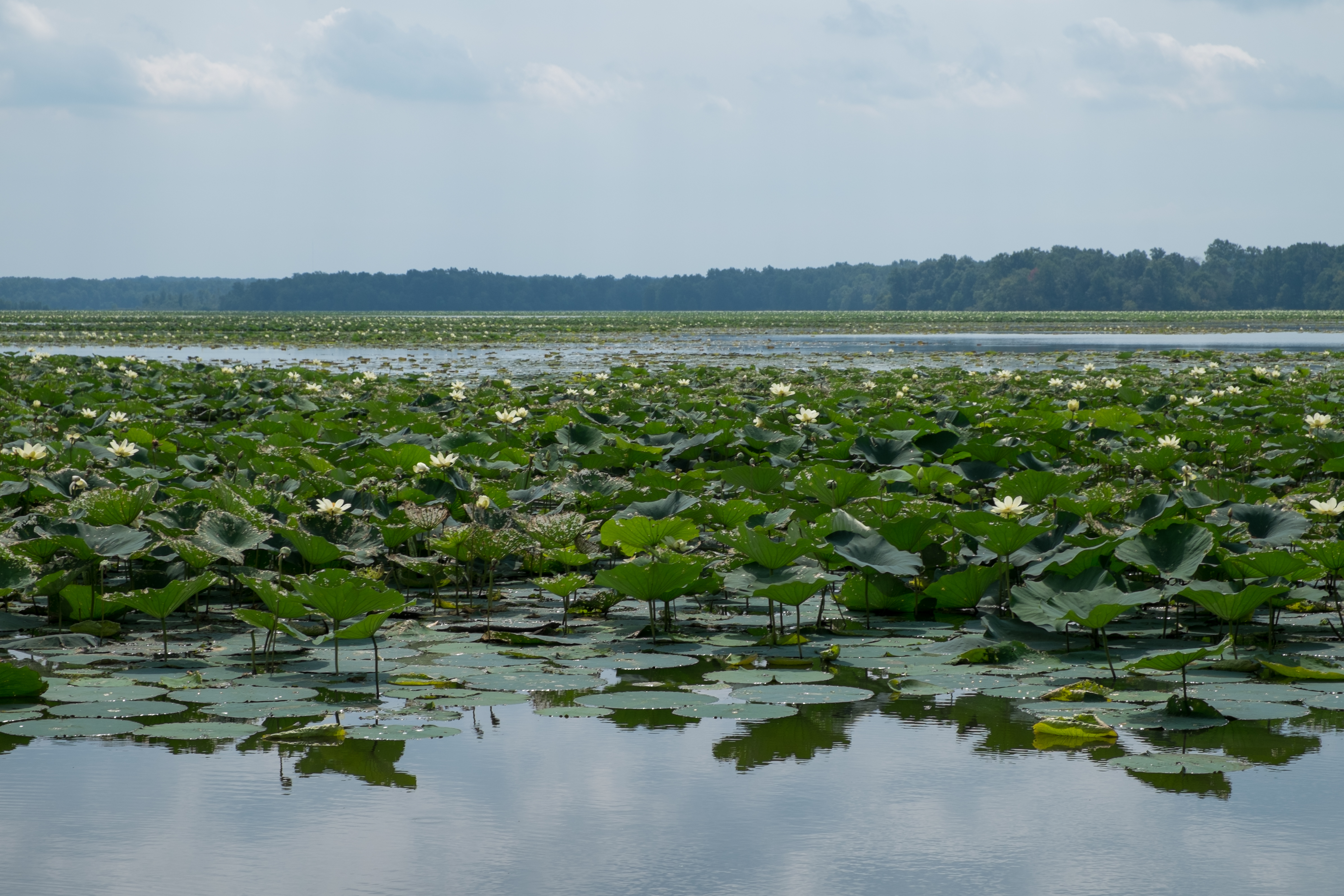
- Crab Orchard Lake, September 2019

- Location within Illinois
- Location: Williamson County, Illinois
- Coordinates: 37°43′31″N 89°06′19″W
- Type: reservoir
- Primary inflows: Crab Orchard Creek
- Primary outflows: Crab Orchard Creek
- Basin countries: United States
- Surface area: 6,965 acres (2,819 ha)
- Average depth: 9.1 ft (2.8 m)
- Max. depth: 25 ft (7.6 m)
- Settlements: Carbondale Crainville herrin Marion

Crab Orchard Lake is a 6,965-acre (28.2 km²) reservoir in Williamson County, Illinois. It is the centerpiece of the Crab Orchard National Wildlife Refuge. It is fed by Devils Kitchen Lake and Little Grassy Lake, which are also within the National Wildlife Refuge.

Crab Orchard Lake was created when Crab Orchard Creek, a tributary of the Big Muddy River in southern Illinois, was dammed in the 1930s for purposes of recreation and flood control. The Crab Orchard National Wildlife Refuge was established August 5, 1947 following the transfer of all land previously held by the Crab Orchard Creek Project and the Illinois Ordnance Plant to the United States Fish and Wildlife Service.

The lake offers opportunities for boating, camping, fishing, and swimming. Two campgrounds, Bluegill Bay Marina & Campground and Crab Orchard Campground, operate on the northern side of the lake. The Illinois Department of Natural Resources (IDNR) has stocked the lake with largemouth bass, and starting in 2006 has also installed artificial spawning beds in the lake's Grassy Bay (the lakebed's eroded clay and soft muck surfaces are not suited to bass spawning). As of 2008, the record largemouth caught in the lake weighed 10.6 pounds.

Many users of the lake live in the large nearby communities of Carbondale, Herrin, and Marion.

== Controversy ==
Crab Orchard Lake is located in an area of Illinois known for high-sulphur coal and former coal-fired heavy industry, including the smelting and refining of heavy metals. During World War II, munitions such as TNT were produced at the Illinois Ordnance Plant north of the lake. A postwar factory, Sangamo-Weston, used PCBs extensively. Chemists have found that much of the lake and the watershed that drains into it is contaminated with lead and other toxic substances.

Under a mandate from the U.S. Congress, the Crab Orchard National Wildlife Refuge is charged with the dual duties of maintaining recreational facilities and leasing lakeside land to factories.
