= Orchard Hill =

Orchard Hill may refer to:

== Towns ==
- Orchard Hill, Georgia
- Orchard Hill, Maryland

== Neighborhoods ==
- Orchard Hill, a residential area of Northam, Devon, England
- Orchard Hill (Omaha)

== See also ==
- Orchard Hills (disambiguation)
