= Wallace Orchard =

Canadian ice hockey player

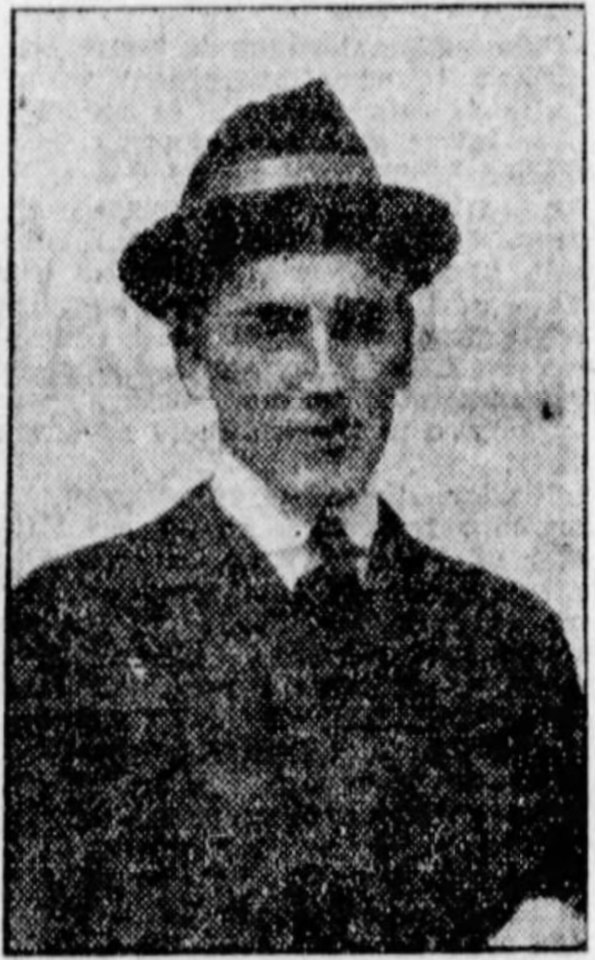
- Born: August 20, 1890; Saint-Lambert, Quebec, Canada
- Died: June 2, 1917 (aged 26); Grévillers, France
- Position: Left wing
- Played for: Montreal AAA; Montreal Victorias
- Playing career: 1908–1915

Wallace Ernest Orchard (August 20, 1890 – June 2, 1917) was a Canadian amateur ice hockey left wing who played for Montreal AAA.

== Military service ==
On January 18, 1916, a year and a half after the outbreak of the First World War, Orchard enlisted in the Royal Naval Air Service. He was noted as a "good steady pilot" and was commissioned as a temporary flight sub-lieutenant in August.

On June 2, 1917, Orchard, stationed with No. 3 Squadron on the Western Front, took off in a Sopwith Pup biplane to intercept German aircraft reported in the area. While mounting an attack on one German plane, he was wounded in the face and subsequently returned to his squadron's airfield. Approximately 200 feet (61 m) above the airstrip, Orchard's aircraft's engine failed, causing the aircraft to crash. The severely wounded Orchard was recovered and transported to No. 1 Field Dressing Station at Beugny, then to the 29th Casualty Clearing Station in Grévillers, where he died of his wounds. Orchard is buried at the Grevillers British Cemetery.

== Career statistics ==
			Regular season					Playoffs
Season	Team	League	GP	G	A	Pts	PIM	GP	G	A	Pts	PIM
1908–09	Montreal AAA	CAHL	1	–	–	–	–	–	–	–	–	–
1914–15	Montreal Victorias	Mtl CSHL	4	1	0	1	0	–	–	–	–	–
Career totals			5	1	0	1	0	–	–	–	–	–
