= Henry John Orchard =

Henry John Orchard (May 7, 1922 – June 23, 2004) was a professor emeritus of electrical engineering at the UCLA Henry Samueli School of Engineering and Applied Science and an authority on filter design and network theory. He died June 23 of 2004 at his home in Santa Monica of respiratory failure. He was 82.

In a monumental breakthrough publication (Electronics Letters, 1966), he explained the "secret" behind the low passband sensitivity of doubly loaded reactance two-ports and showed how to design active two-ports that retain this key attribute. Among Professor Orchard's key contributions was the development of a systematic process for the computer-aided design of filters. During the early years of computer-aided filter design, when the synthesis of a single circuit required several days of multiple-precision computation, his method had an important beneficial effect. He was instrumental in introducing into switched capacitor filter design the bilinear s-z mapping, previously used solely in digital filter design, and in developing a methodology that allowed the use of arbitrary active-RC models for switched-capacitor filter syntheses.
