= Crab Orchard National Wildlife Refuge =

National Wildlife Refuge in southern Illinois

- IUCN category IV (habitat/species management area)
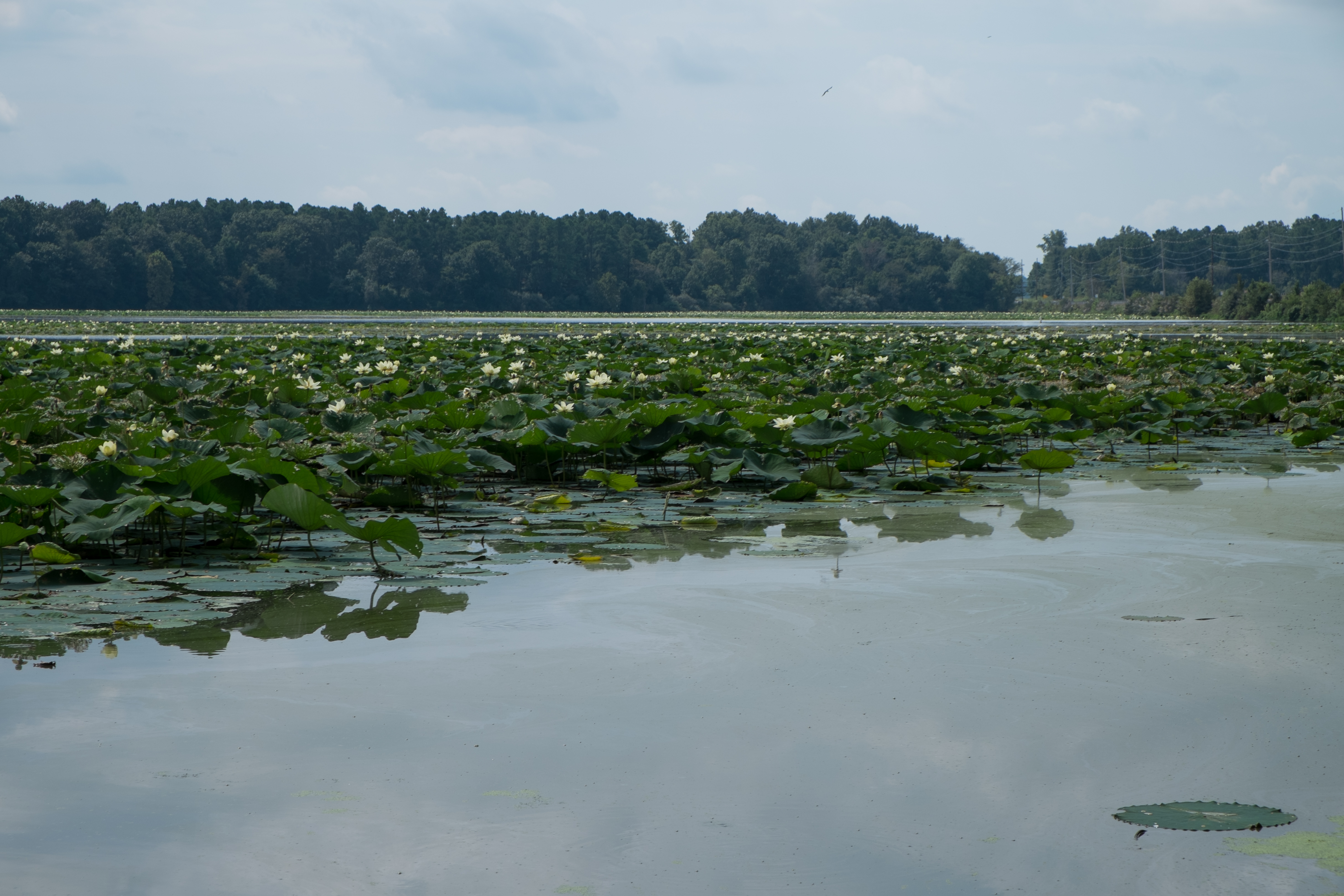
- Crab Orchard Lake, Crab Orchard National Wildlife Refuge, September 2019

- Location within Illinois
- Location: Williamson, Jackson, and Union counties, Illinois, USA
- Nearest city: Marion, Illinois
- Coordinates: 37°42′00″N 89°03′33″W
- Area: 43,890 acres (177.62 km^{2})
- Established: 1947
- Governing body: U.S. Fish and Wildlife Service
- Website: Crab Orchard National Wildlife Refuge

Crab Orchard National Wildlife Refuge is a 43,890 acre (180 km^{2}) National Wildlife Refuge primarily in southwestern Williamson County, but with small extensions into adjacent eastern Jackson and northeastern Union counties of southern Illinois, in the United States. Its land and water contain a wide diversity of flora and fauna. It centers on Crab Orchard Lake. Major habitat types on the refuge include hardwood forest, agricultural land, grazing units, brushland, wetlands, and lakes. Other major bodies of water on the refuge are Devil's Kitchen Lake and Little Grassy Lake.

== Description ==
The refuge provides significant resting areas for migratory birds utilizing the Mississippi Flyway. Wintering numbers of Canada geese can peak at 200,000. A total of nearly 1000 vascular plant species, 245 bird species, 33 mammal species, 63 fish species, and 44 reptile and amphibian species have been documented on the refuge.

The western 24,000 acres (97 km^{2}) of the refuge provide a wide range of recreational opportunities and also include a 4,050 acre (16 km^{2}) wilderness area. The eastern portion, 20,000 acres (81 km^{2}), is a wildlife sanctuary, and public use is limited.

Annual visitation is approximately 1,000,000 visitors. Industrial activities on the refuge range from manufacturing and storage facilities to administrative offices. Many buildings now housing industries were used in the manufacturing of high explosives during World War II, and they are still used for military ordnance production today. The concrete igloos built for munition storage are now leased to private industry for storage of many types of products.

Crab Orchard National Wildlife Refuge is managed with four broad objectives: wildlife management, agriculture, recreation, and industry. The primary wildlife management objective is to satisfy the food and resting needs of wintering Canada geese and other wildlife. This objective is coordinated with the agriculture objective through cooperative farming and permittee grazing programs.

== Crab Orchard Wilderness ==
The Crab Orchard Wilderness, a federally listed 4,050-acre (16.4 km^{2}) U.S. wilderness area, occupies the southernmost strip of the National Wildlife Refuge.

== Flora ==
Flora of Crab Orchard National Wildlife Refuge
Plant Group	Families	Genera	Species
Pteridophytes (Ferns & Allies)	15	20	27
Gymnosperms	3	4	9
Monocots	26	111	300
Dicots	96	353	645
Totals	140	488	981
