= Orchard Park =

Orchard Park may refer to:

== Places ==
=== Canada ===
- Royal Orchard Park in Markham, Ontario
- Orchard Park Shopping Centre in Kelowna, British Columbia

=== United Kingdom ===
- Orchard Park, Cambridgeshire (previously known as Arbury Park)
- Orchard Park, Laugharne, a street in Laugharne.
- Orchard Park Estate, a council estate in Kingston upon Hull

=== United States ===
- Orchard Park, New York, a town in Erie County New York
  - Orchard Park (village), New York, within the Town of Orchard Park
- Orchard Park, Lancaster County, Pennsylvania
- Orchard Park (Fremont County, Colorado)
- Orchard Park (Omaha), a park in Omaha, Nebraska
- Orchard Park (Oregon), a city park in Hillsboro, Oregon
- Orchard Park, a section of the Roxbury neighborhood of Boston, Massachusetts
- Orchard Park (neighborhood), Indiana, a neighborhood in Carmel, Indiana

== Other ==
- "Orchard Park" (song), a 2017 song by Aaron West and the Roaring Twenties
