= Orchard Lake =

Orchard Lake may refer to:

- Orchard Lake (Michigan), a lake in Oakland County
- Orchard Lake (Minnesota), a lake in Dakota County
- Orchard Lake Village, Michigan, a city in Oakland County
