= Little Grassy Lake (Illinois) =

- Location within Illinois Location within the United States
- Location: Jackson County, Illinois and Williamson County, Illinois
- Coordinates: 37°38′12″N 89°08′44″W
- Type: reservoir
- Primary inflows: Little Grassy Creek
- Primary outflows: Little Grassy Creek
- Basin countries: United States
- Max. length: 4 mi (6.4 km)
- Max. width: 0.5 mi (0.80 km)
- Surface area: 1,200 acres (490 ha)
- Shore length^{1}: 36 miles (58 km)
- Surface elevation: 499 ft (152 m)
- ^{1} Shore length is not a well-defined measure.

Little Grassy Lake is a 1,200 acres (490 ha) reservoir lakebed in southern Illinois, created by the damming of Little Grassy Creek, a tributary of Crab Orchard Lake and the Big Muddy River. Most of the lake is located in Williamson County, southeast of Carbondale, Illinois. The lake is accessible from Giant City Road out of Carbondale, Illinois. Two arms of the lake penetrate into adjacent Jackson County. The lake is managed by the U.S. Fish and Wildlife Service as part of the Crab Orchard National Wildlife Refuge. As part of a multi-year construction project to repair and replace the Little Grassy Lake dam and spillway, authorities announced plans in 2025 to temporarily drain the lake.

== History ==
Little Grassy Lake was built in 1940 as part of federal relief efforts surrounding recovery from the Great Depression. The surrounding hills, forested with oak and hickory trees, did not offer good farming potential, and the federal government condemned the farms to construct the lake.

In 1959, activity around the lake increased when the Illinois Department of Natural Resources (IDNR) chose a land parcel near the Little Grassy dam as the site for its primary warm-water hatchery for the production of fish such as largemouth bass, bluegill, channel catfish, and redear sunfish for stocking. As of 2007, 15.0 million fingerlings were produced annually.

== The lake today ==
The Pine Ridge Boy Scout Reservation is situated on the Northeastern edge of the lake, almost a mile away from the dam. Until 2025, Little Grassy Lake was managed for warmwater fishing, with largemouth bass, bluegill, channel catfish, and crappie stocked and caught. There was a power limit on the lake, with motors restricted to 10 h.p. or less. A U.S. Fish and Wildlife Service permit was required for use of the lake. The campground and marina closed in late 2024 in preparation for the lake drawdown.

Little Grassy Lake continues to be IDNR's sole catfish hatchery. For catfish, the spawning and fish maturation process requires at least one year, with mature fish spawning on or around June 1; the fish take at least 13 months to grow to a "nonvulnerable" length of 8 inches (20 cm) and are typically ready for delivery to their new homes in July of the following summer. IDNR distributes Little Grassy catfish to 220 separate Illinois waterways.

A stretch of spillway directly below the Little Grassy dam, measuring 0.2 miles (0.3 km) in length, was a noted whitewater spot, rated at Class II-IV depending on spillway flow conditions. Prior to its closure, the spillway tended to operate during rain or snow meltwater runoff events in winter and early spring.

== Drainage ==
After the United States Army Corps of Engineers condemned the Little Grassy Lake dam spillway in late 2024, planning began for an operation to drain the lake. Authorities stated that the 80-year-old dam and spillway “had aged beyond its engineered design life,” creating the possibility for catastrophic flooding should the lake remain bank-full. The operation was described as “a complete lake draw-down.”
