= Orchard Hills =

Orchard Hills may refer to:

- Fountainhead-Orchard Hills, Maryland, a census-designated place in Maryland
- Orchard Hills, New South Wales, a suburb in New South Wales
- Orchard Hills, Irvine, California, a village in Irvine, California

== See also ==
- Orchard Hill (disambiguation)
