= Panther Den Wilderness =

Wilderness area in Illinois, United States

- IUCN category Ib (wilderness area)
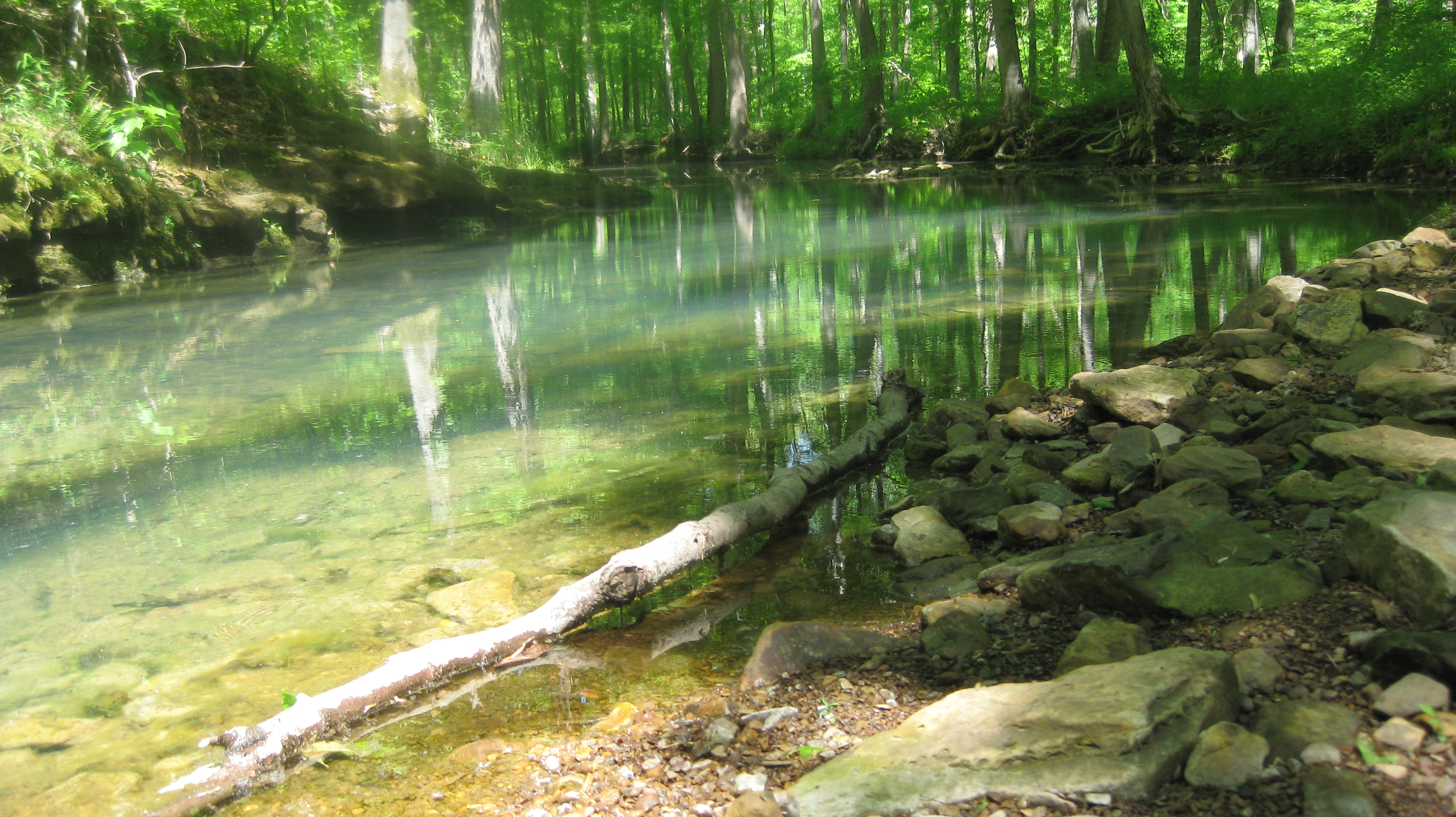
- Runoff of Devil's Kitchen Lake

- Location within the United States
- Location: Union County, Illinois, USA
- Nearest city: Goreville, Illinois
- Coordinates: 37°35′34″N 89°04′30″W
- Area: 1,195 acres (484 ha)
- Established: 1990
- Governing body: U.S. Forest Service

The Panther Den Wilderness is a 1,195-acre (4.84 km^{2}) parcel of land listed as a Wilderness Area of the United States. It is located within the Shawnee National Forest in Union County in the U.S. state of Illinois. Panther Den Wilderness is the smallest of eight Wilderness areas in Illinois. The other seven are Bald Knob Wilderness, Bay Creek Wilderness, Burden Falls Wilderness, Clear Springs Wilderness, Crab Orchard Wilderness, Garden of the Gods, and Lusk Creek Wilderness. All Illinois Wilderness areas are located in Southern Illinois.

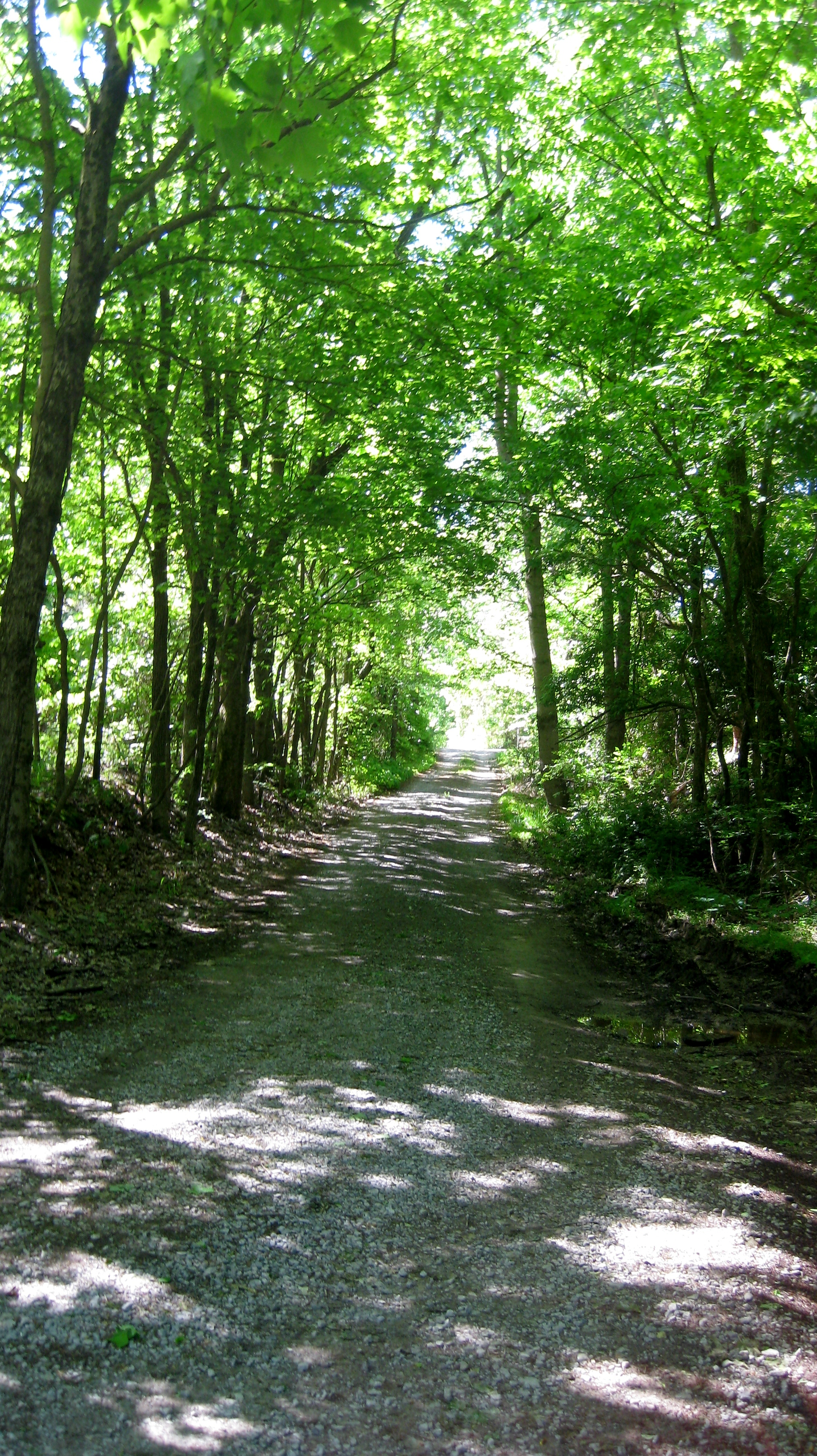
Panther Den Road

We are living in a time of "...increasing population, accompanied by expanding settlement and growing mechanization", that is why it is important that individual play a role in helping to "secure for the American people of present and future generations the benefits of an enduring resource of wilderness" as called for by the Congress of the United States through the Wilderness Act of 1964. Thanks to the Wilderness Act the Panther Den became a Wilderness Area on November 28, 1990. According to Public Law 101-633 Congress legislated 940 acres to the Panther Den Wilderness.

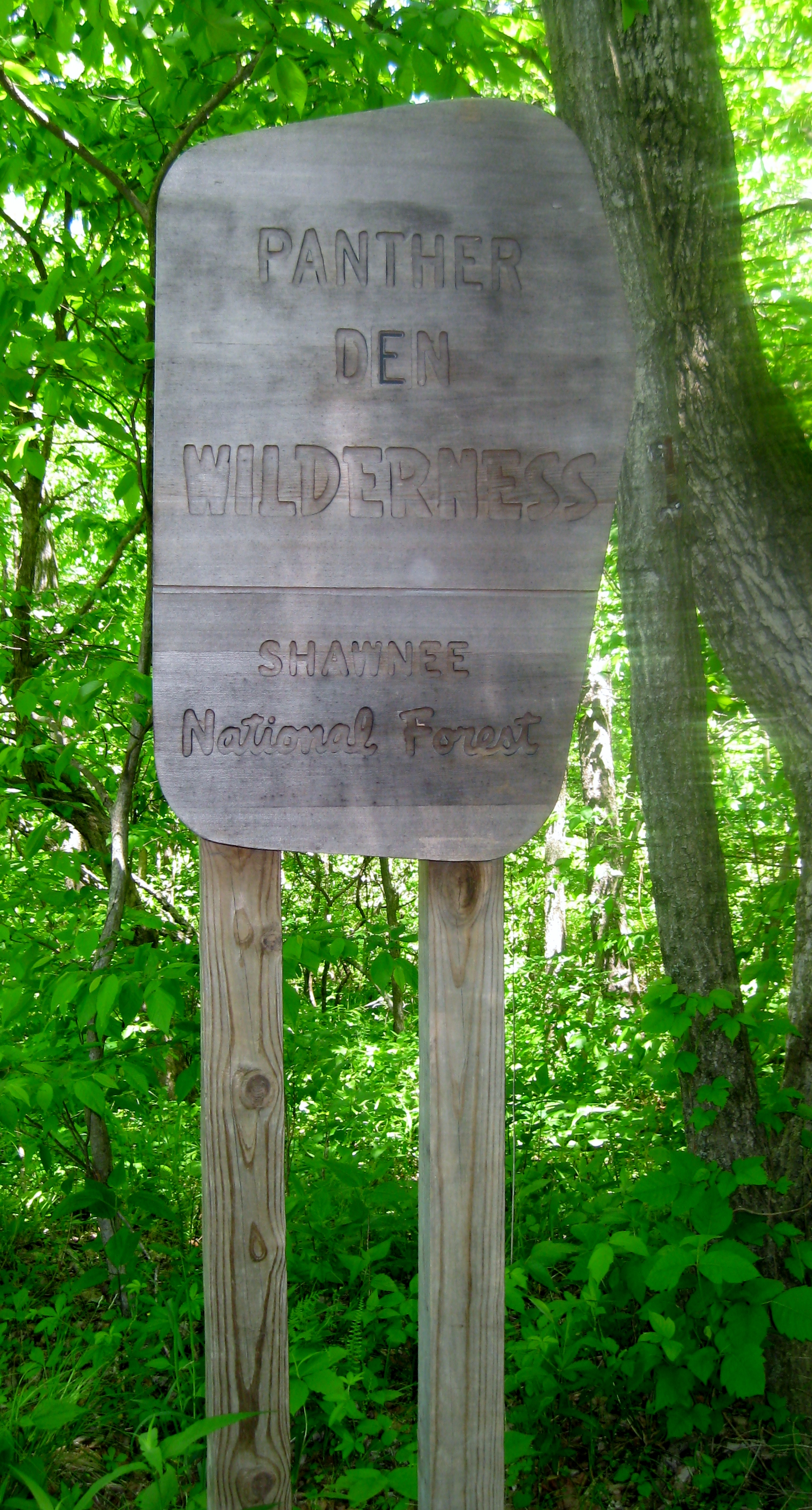
Panther Den Wilderness marker

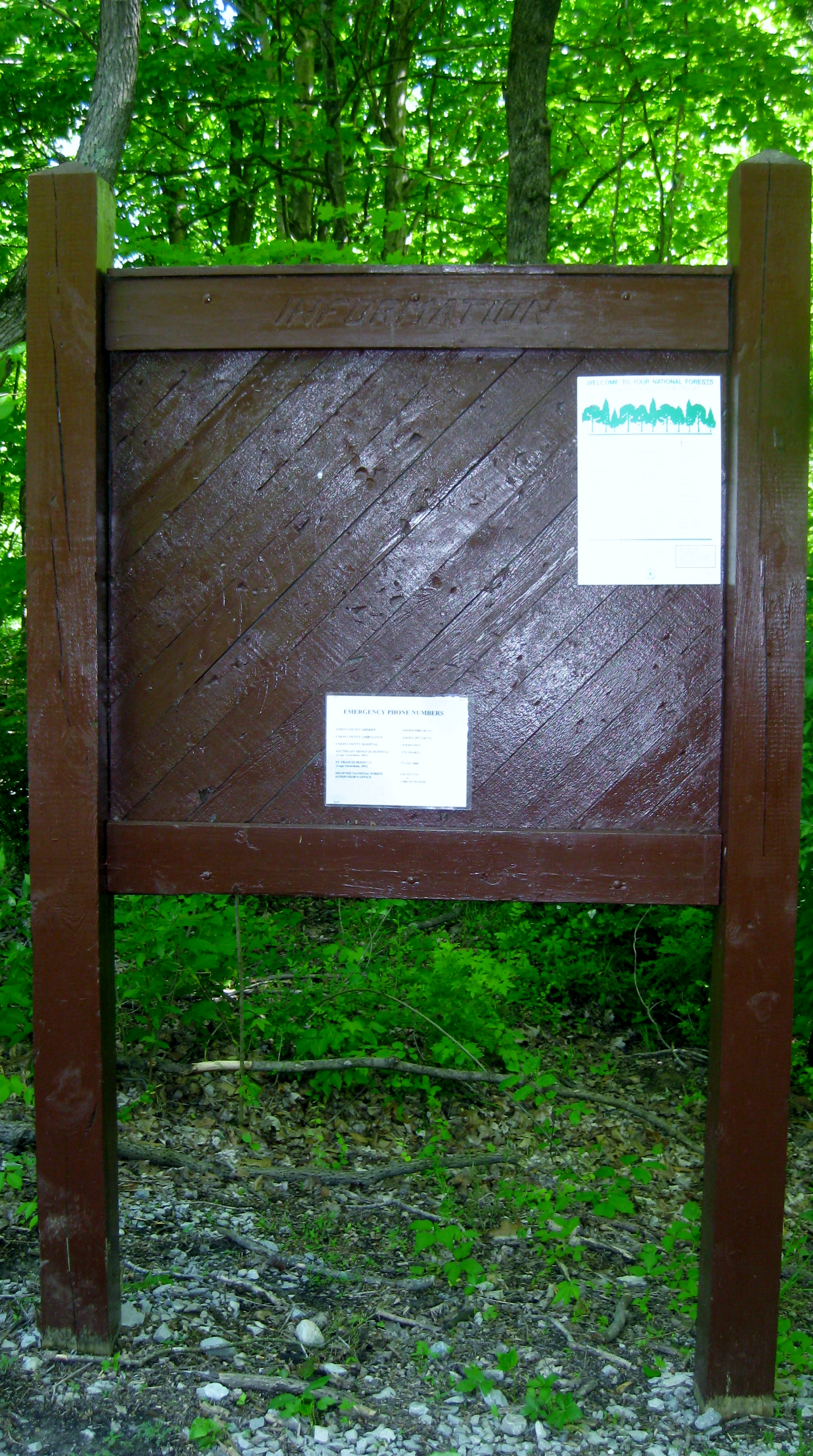
The trailhead marker currently contains no map of Panther Den

== Second-growth wilderness ==
As with other wilderness areas within Shawnee National Forest, the Panther Den Wilderness is made of second-growth forested areas that were used, until the land acquisitions of the 1930s, as agriculture land. The United States Forest Service manages much of the wilderness; the agency describes it as a land of "homestead[s], fruit trees, cemeteries, and abandoned roads".

Shawnee National Forest was created in 1939, and in 1990, the Illinois Wilderness Act set aside seven separate parcels of land within this National Forest as relatively small wilderness areas. The Panther Den Wilderness, one of these parcels, is a roadless parcel of land within the national forest. It forms part of the southern shore of Devils Kitchen Lake.

Panther Den Wilderness is served by the River to River Trail.

== Management ==
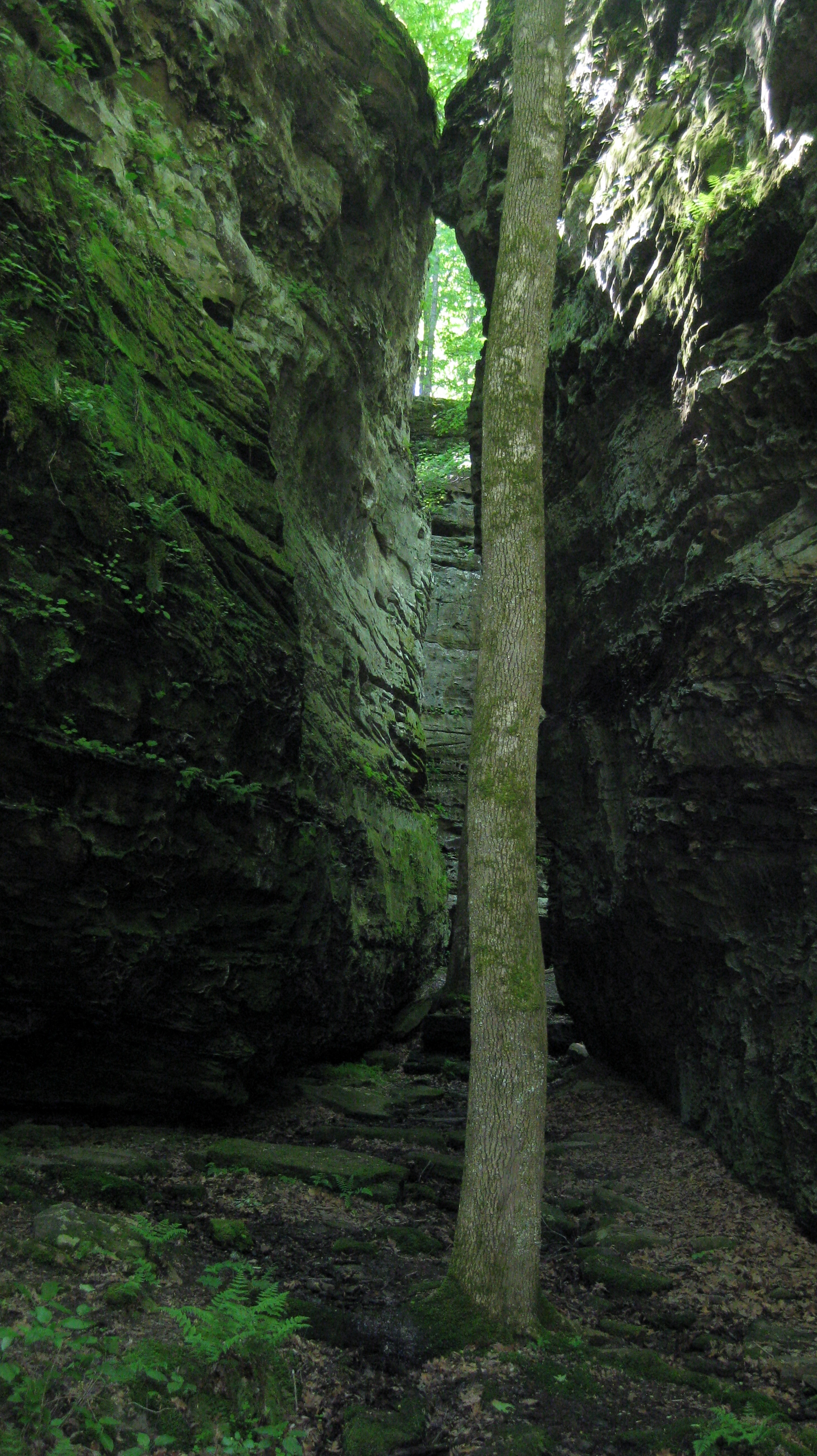
Panther Den cliffs

The part of Panther Den Wilderness area that is managed by the United States Forest Service is 1,081 acres. All wilderness areas in the state of Illinois are managed by the USFS, with the exception of 114 acres in the northern part of Panther Den Wilderness. This section lies within the Crab Orchard National Wildlife Wilderness Area, and so is managed by the United States Fish and Wildlife Service. The US Fish and Wildlife also manages Devils Kitchen Lake which has three fingers that dip into Panther Den Wilderness area. Since this is a Wilderness area, it is open to hikers, backpacking, climbing, kayaking, canoeing, rafting, horse packing, bird watching, stargazing, and individuals who are looking for solitude. That means no ATVs, bicycles, motorized equipment, motorized vehicles, hang gliders, motorboats, landing strips or other wheeled vehicles are allowed in this area. As stated by the USFS, "All wilderness users should exercise good outdoor ethics, which include; bringing a compass, appropriate maps, drinking water, observing adjacent private landowner rights and Leave No Trace practices. Campers are encouraged to register with the nearest Ranger District." Many people have gotten lost in the Panthers Den Wilderness area over the years.

== Features ==
Like all National Wilderness Areas, no mechanized vehicles are allowed within Panther Den Wilderness. Since the network of trails is designed only for foot and equestrian traffic, it includes mostly class II trails. Many of the trails that have been in use since before Panther Den was designated as a wilderness area are actually former abandoned roads. Many of the trails are heavily impacted due to overuse by horseback riders and hikers. As of 2012, new trails are being constructed to let the environment restore some of the old trails to a more natural condition. There are many options for day hikes, as well as camping. However, users are encouraged by the US Forest Service to not use many of the user created campsites scattered around the wilderness area. Many of these highly impacted areas are located within 300 feet of the trail, which is considered too close by many wilderness education organizations such as Leave No Trace. The main hiking loop is the Panther Den Loop and intersects with a section of the River to River trail. Panther Den Wilderness is located in the Lick Creek quadrangle, inside Union County, just below the Williamson County border. The highest point is at an elevation of approximately 700 feet. Panther Den Wilderness gets its name from its main attraction, Panther Den, which is a large sandstone rock formation with large crevices providing many opportunities for bouldering and exploration.
