= Sapphire Ventures =

Silicon Valley-based venture capital company

Sapphire Ventures, LLC
- Industry: Venture Capital
- Founded: 1996
- Headquarters: Menlo Park, California, U.S.
- Key people: Nino Marakovic (CEO); Jai Das (President); Abigail Johnson (COO); Cristina Hohlman (CFO); Robert Severo (CCO)
- Total assets: $10.2 billion
- Website: sapphireventures.com

Sapphire Ventures (stylized as SAPPHIRE) is a venture capital firm with offices in Menlo Park, San Francisco, Austin, and London. The firm is considered one of the world's premier venture capital firms.

The firm primarily invests in Series B through IPO technology companies, as well as tech-focused early stage venture firms, seed, and Series A early-stage sports, media, and entertainment start-ups.

Notable Sapphire-backed companies include 23andMe, Alteryx, Auth0, Block (Square), Box, Current, Degreed, DocuSign, Fitbit, IAS, JumpCloud, Kaltura, Linkedin, Livongo, Looker, MuleSoft, Monday.com, Paytm, Ping Identity, Sumo Logic, Wise (TransferWise).

== History ==
The firm was founded in 1996 as the venture capital arm of multinational software conglomerate SAP and spun out as an independent company in 2011, rebranding to Sapphire Ventures in 2014. At the time, Sapphire Ventures managed $1.4 billion and had invested in more than 125 companies, with 10 companies going public and 17 getting acquired.

In 2012, the firm launched Sapphire Partners, a real-time fund making investments in early-stage venture capital funds based in North America, Europe, and Israel. The strategy also includes direct co-investing alongside Sapphire Partners' GPs.

In 2015, Sapphire partnered with technology companies Cisco Systems and Siemens to co-host the first industry summit on the Internet of Things, named "IoT: Empowering The Enterprise" in San Jose, California. Sapphire had been an investor in Control4, an IoT company which completed its initial public offering in 2013.

In 2019, the firm launched Sapphire Sport, a fund dedicated to backing companies at the intersection of sports, media, and entertainment. Backers of the fund included Manchester City's City Football Group (CFG) alongside owners, investors, and family offices from the National Football League (NFL), Major League Baseball (MLB), National Basketball Association (NBA), National Hockey League (NHL), and Major League Soccer (MLS). Later in 2019, Sapphire Ventures re-launched #OpenLP, a community to foster idea sharing, open dialogue and overall greater connectivity among entrepreneurs, venture capitalists and limited partners (LPs). That year, Sapphire also raised $1.4 billion across investment strategies, including a $150 million opportunity fund to support larger deals.

In 2021, the firm raised $1.7 billion in February and an additional $2 billion in November across multiple investment strategies, with its assets under management surpassing $8.8 billion. This increase in capital also allowed the firm to expand its Portfolio Growth capabilities. Later that year, Sapphire made a major expansion in Europe and appointed Annalise Dragic as partner, making Dragic one of the youngest female venture capital partners in Europe.

In 2022, Sapphire Ventures joined the board of the National Venture Capital Association with one of the firm's partners, Beezer Clarkson serving from 2022 through 2026. The firm additionally became the official sponsor of PitchBook's podcast.

In early 2023, the firm announced a new $181 million fund for Sapphire Sport.

== Investment Strategies ==
Sapphire has funds that comprise three primary investment strategies: Sapphire Ventures, Sapphire Partners, and Sapphire Sport spanning across early through growth stages and through direct and fund-of-fund investments.

=== Sapphire Ventures ===
Sapphire Ventures invests in high-growth, expansion-stage technology companies, specifically focusing on artificial intelligence & machine learning, B2B SaaS, web3, cyber security, data & analytics, devops, fintech, health tech, and vertical SaaS.

=== Sapphire Partners ===
Sapphire Partners is a limited partner that backs early-stage tech venture funds, from seed funds as small as $40 million up to series A investors with more than $100 million in capital. The strategy has invested in funds including Union Square Ventures, Amplify Partners, SaaStr, Point Nine Capital, Data Collective, and Screendoor among others. The strategy was originally set up as a $405 million fund of funds and was later modified to recycle distributions to meet future contribution obligations.

Additionally, along with this investment strategy, Sapphire supports an online community called #OpenLP aimed at educating venture investors and tech entrepreneurs about issues related to the venture ecosystem which it relaunched in 2019.

=== Sapphire Sport ===
Sapphire Sport invests in early-stage technology companies at the intersection of sport, media and entertainment. In early 2019 the strategy launched a $115 million investment vehicle, and in 2023 it another $181 million fund. The strategy has been backed by affiliates of the world's largest and most well-known sports leagues such as City Football Group as well as Adidas, AEG, SAP, Sinclair Broadcast Group, and Madison Square Garden. In early 2023 Investments have included Aglet, Breathwrk, Buzzer, Fevo, Flowhaven, Green Park, Jackpot.com, Manicore, Mixhalo, Overtime, PlayVS, POAP, Tonal, and Trust. Exits include MyCujoo and Phoenix Labs.

== Portfolio Growth ==
Sapphire's Portfolio Growth division works with its portfolio companies and venture funds to offer support in the areas of customer, partner, and executive talent introductions. As part of the firm's $1.7 billion capital raise in 2021, the Portfolio Growth division saw an expansion. The division also has a "centers of excellence" strategy which offers founders support with sales and GTM strategies, international expansion, insights into how CIO and CXO enterprise decision-makers evaluate new and emerging technologies, and capital market oversight.

The division makes hundreds of executive talent and customer introductions each year.

The firm was recognized during the COVID-19 pandemic for coming up with creative ways to guide and share playbooks developed for and during the pandemic.

== Investments ==
Since the firm's founding, Sapphire has invested in more than 130 companies across 10 countries, with more than 70 exits across 30 IPOs and 45 acquisitions making it one of the most active venture capital firms based on public exits.

Notable Sapphire-backed portfolio companies that have experienced IPOs or acquisitions include:

- 23andMe (Merged with SPAC)
- Alteryx (IPO)
- Apigee (IPO, Acquisition by Google)
- Auth0 (Acquired by Okta)
- AvidXchange (IPO)
- Block / Square (IPO)
- Braze (IPO)
- Box (IPO)
- Cazoo (Merged with SPAC)
- Control4 (IPO)
- DocuSign (IPO)
- ExactTarget (IPO Acquired by Salesforce)
- Fitbit (IPO, Acquired by Google)
- Five9 (IPO)
- Integral Ad Science (IPO)
- JFrog (IPO)
- Kaltura (IPO)
- Linkedin (IPO, Acquired by Microsoft)
- Livongo (IPO, Merger with Teladoc)
- Looker (Acquired by Google)
- MuleSoft (IPO, Acquired by Salesforce)
- Monday.com (IPO)
- Paytm (IPO)
- Ping Identity (IPO, Acquired by Thoma Bravo)
- Sumo Logic (IPO)
- Wise / TransferWise (IPO)

Some of Sapphire's current investments include: 6Sense, BetterUp, BlockDaemon, Brightfield, Catchpoint, Current, Clari, Degreed, feedzai, JumpCloud, LeanData, Mercury, Pendo, Reltio, and Tetrate.

== Recognition ==
CB Insights recognized Sapphire Ventures as Top 5 VC based on participation in major tech exits. Specifically, the independent study compiled a list of VCs with at least five of the top 100 exits in the period between Q1 2013 and Q2 2015 and ranked each VC according to how many of these exits they were involved in. Sapphire Ventures was named #4 on the list with 10 exits, behind Accel, New Enterprise Associates and Sequoia Capital.

PitchBook highlighted Sapphire Ventures as a Top 5 VC based on public exits in 2016. The firm was named alongside Sequoia, IVP, Accel, New Enterprise Associates, DAG Ventures, Bessemer, and Kleiner Perkins.

Inc. Magazine named Sapphire Ventures a "founder friendly" investor in both 2022 and 2021.

In 2022, Sapphire was recognized as one of the "world's premier venture capital firms", specifically noting the capabilities of the firm to invest across verticals within software including web3 and next generation media.
