= Boomi =

Boomi may refer to:

== Places ==
- Boomi, New South Wales, a town in Australia
- Boomi River, in New South Wales, Australia
- Boomi Shire, a local government area in New South Wales, Australia

== Films ==
- Boomi Malayalam, a 2009 Malayalam film
- Pudhiya Boomi, a 1968 Indian Tamil film
- Punniya Boomi, a 1978 Indian Tamil film
- Sethu Boomi, a 2016 Indian Tamil film

== Other uses ==
- Boomi, LP, an American technology company

== See also ==
- Bhoomi (disambiguation)
- Bhumi (disambiguation)
- Boomie Richman (1921–2016), American saxophone player
