= 3scale =

American internet technology company

- Type: Subsidiary
- Industry: Internet; Computer software
- Founded: December 2007
- Defunct: 2016
- Successor: Red Hat
- Headquarters: San Francisco, CA
- Area served: Worldwide
- Parent: Red Hat
- Website: 3scale.net

3scale is an internet technology company that develops API management software.

== History ==
3scale was co-founded by Steven Willmott and Martin Tantow in 2007. A public beta began in November 2008. The company's commercial product was released in March 2009. It sells API Management software called 3scale Connect and a premium version that comes with support and an SLA. A set of three additional APIs were released in October 2011.

In April 2012, 3scale released a new version of its API Management Platform and Infrastructure, including new features such as ActiveDocs, powered by the Swagger API framework developed by Wordnik, as well as allowing API providers to create interactive REST documentation out of the box.

In March 2013, 3scale received $4.2 million in funding to build additional functionality to the product and expand internationally.

On June 22, 2016, Red Hat announced the purchase of 3scale and the open sourcing of their software.

== See also ==
- API management
- CA Technologies
- MuleSoft
- WSO2
