= Headless commerce =

E-commerce architecture

Information
- Category: E-commerce architecture
- Core principle: Decoupling of front-end presentation and back-end logic
- Primary interface: APIs (REST, GraphQL)
- Related concepts: Headless CMS; Microservices; SaaS

Headless commerce is an e-commerce architecture where the front-end (head) is decoupled from the back-end commerce functionality and can thus be updated or edited without interfering with the back-end, similar to a headless content management system (CMS). The term was coined by Dirk Hoerig, co-founder of Commercetools, in 2013.

== History ==
Headless commerce was arguably born out of a 2013 Forrester Research report that bemoaned e-commerce vendors falling behind user experience trends and recommended "loosely" coupling the back- and front-ends of e-commerce stores.

== Architecture ==
Headless commerce architecture passes requests between a platform's presentation and application layers. The presentation layer is connected with the e-commerce functionality via REST APIs, or application programming interfaces, which define interactions between multiple software intermediaries. This allows businesses to change customer-facing experiences without disrupting backend functionality and to update, edit or change products and distribute via API to multiple front-ends. REST APIs are the backbone of this architecture.

== Coupled e-commerce vs headless e-commerce ==
Headless commerce is distinct from coupled, traditional or "monolithic" e-commerce in that the latter relies on a front-end and back-end that function together and the former comprises solely a back-end which communicates with front-ends via APIs.

Headless commerce platforms offer several advantages over traditional e-commerce platforms, in that changes to data and functionality only need to be made in a single back-end, with all front-ends then having immediate access to those changes. Likewise, each front-end can then be changed and deployed without impacting the back-end. Another difference is that many traditional e-commerce platforms come with predefined front-end templates or customization, whereas headless commerce can power any front-end via APIs.

Headless commerce platforms require more work and customization than traditional platforms and are often not suitable for smaller businesses. Such platforms lack predesigned templates and do not provide all-in-one solutions. Headless commerce platforms also require developers to build or buy a separate front-end.

Headless commerce may be preferred from a quality assurance perspective, as traditional e-commerce platforms face a higher risk of making changes that could disrupt operations, since the front end and back end are coupled. Because headless commerce communicates with the front-end via APIs and there is no code intertwined with the backend database that stores content, frontend developers can adapt endpoint layout as needed with no disruptions to the customer experience.

=== Flexibility ===
The front-ends and back-ends of a headless system are decoupled, making it possible to change the content layer without disrupting business. This creates flexibility to allow the front- and back-ends to work independently and create new user experiences without compromising old ones. There is also no confining code that restricts delivery to internet of things devices, applications, web browsers or other end points.

=== Speed ===
The decoupled architecture of headless commerce enables developers to make quick changes, such as implementing new functionalities and integrations without disrupting the back end.

Headless storefronts, often built with frameworks like React-based Remix (which Hydrogen uses), can pre-render pages on the server (SSR - Server-Side Rendering) or at build time (SSG - Static Site Generation). This delivers lightning-fast initial page loads (crucial for Core Web Vitals and SEO), with subsequent interactions handled quickly by client-side JavaScript. This translates directly to improved SEO rankings and higher conversion rates.

=== Omnichannel Expansion ===
Since the "head" is decoupled, you can use the same Shopify backend to power a website, a native mobile app, a smartwatch app, an in-store kiosk, or even IoT devices. A single source of truth for products and orders across all channels simplifies management for developers.

=== Personalization ===
Headless commerce allows for the creation of customized designs and layouts for different endpoints, since front-end design can be changed without impacting the back-end.

=== Unified user experience ===
Headless commerce allows a business to control all customer touchpoints at once. This creates a consistent customer experience across different front-ends that enable customers to complete a purchase at any touch point.

== Headless commerce providers ==
- Bagisto
- BigCommerce
- bl!nk
- Brink Commerce
- Broadleaf Commerce
- Commerce.js
- Commercetools
- Crystallize
- ElasticPath
- Fabric
- frntkey.io
- Magento
- Medusa
- Microsoft Dynamics 365 Commerce
- Nacelle
- Oracle CX Commerce
- Pcommerce
- Rierino
- SAP Commerce Cloud
- Salesforce Commerce Cloud
- Shogun
- ShopWired
- Shopify Plus
- Slatwall Commerce
- Slixta
- Spryker
- Swell
- Thor Commerce
- VetrinaLive
- VTEX
- Diginyze

== See also ==
- Headless content management system
- Shopping cart software
