= Broadleaf Commerce =

Composable commerce platform and managed PaaS

- Type: Limited liability company
- Industry: E-commerce
- Founded: 2008
- Founder: Brian Polster
- Headquarters: Plano, Texas
- Number of locations: 2
- Website: broadleafcommerce.com

Broadleaf Commerce is a source-available composable e-commerce platform headquartered in Plano, Texas, built on Java and Spring Framework. Founded in 2008 by Brian Polster, the company is employee-owned and privately held. The platform supports MACH-aligned architecture — Microservices, API-first, Cloud-native, and Headless — and serves enterprise businesses across retail, automotive, telecommunications, and finance industries. The platform is available as source-available software that can be self-hosted on-premise or on any cloud provider, or deployed as a fully managed Platform as a Service (PaaS) through Broadleaf Cloud. Broadleaf Commerce is a Corporate Member of TM Forum. Its clients include Major League Baseball, O'Reilly Auto Parts, and The Container Store.

== History ==
Broadleaf Commerce was founded in 2008 by Brian Polster with backing from Credera Finance.

In July 2010, Broadleaf launched the first version of its framework as an open-source software platform with enterprise and community editions. Broadleaf subsequently transitioned to a source-available commercial licensing model.

On January 1, 2012, Broadleaf Commerce became an independent entity and gained legal separation from Credera Finance.

In 2015, Broadleaf was selected for the 2015 Best of Addison Award in the eCommerce Framework category by the Addison Award Program.

In 2016, Broadleaf was recognized by Texas A&M University in their 2016 Aggie 100 list, ranking 44th with an average growth rate of 43%.

In 2017, Broadleaf ranked 2420th on the Inc. 5000 list of fastest-growing private companies in the United States, with a three-year growth rate of 149%. That same year, Broadleaf ranked 35th on the Aggie 100 list with an average growth rate of 45.8%.

In 2022, Broadleaf launched Broadleaf Commerce Cloud, a fully managed Platform as a Service (PaaS) offering.

== Products ==
=== Commerce Platform ===
The Broadleaf Commerce Platform is a source-available, microservices-based e-commerce platform built on Java and Spring Framework. The platform provides extensibility at four layers: data, microservice, API, and administration, allowing development teams to modify any layer of the commerce stack independently.

The platform serves enterprise businesses across multiple industries and use cases, including retail, automotive, telecommunications, and finance. Supported commerce use cases include B2B commerce, B2C commerce, unified commerce, multi-brand management, and marketplace commerce.

=== Transaction Suite ===
The Transaction Suite covers cart and checkout management, inventory and fulfillment, customer and order management, and payment and tax processing. It supports multiple payment gateway integrations, serialized inventory tracking, configurable shipping rules, and customer service representative (CSR) tooling including shop-on-behalf-of functionality and return merchandise authorization (RMA) processing.

=== Merchandising Suite ===
The Merchandising Suite covers catalog management, product browse and search, pricing and promotions, and headless content management. It supports hierarchical catalog structures, sandboxing and approval workflows, and multi-language search via Apache Solr integration. Pricing options include product-level fields, price lists, currency conversion, and promotional offer types including percentage-off, amount-off, buy-X-get-Y, tiered, bundle, and voucher offers. Offers can be targeted by customer segment, date, specific products, or geolocation.

=== Microservices Accelerator ===
The Microservices Accelerator for Enterprise Applications (MAFEA) provides foundational infrastructure services for the Broadleaf platform, including a unified administration console, multi-tenancy management, authentication and authorization, sandboxing, bulk operations, data import and export, scheduled jobs, and metadata-driven admin extensibility built in React.

=== A la Carte Microservices ===
Broadleaf Commerce includes over 30 individually deployable microservices that can be adopted independently or as part of the full platform. Available microservices include:

- Asset — digital content and metadata management, with connections to product catalogs and CMS
- Campaign — campaign management and offer code generation
- Cart — creation, management, and retrieval of hierarchical cart structures
- Cart Operations — checkout process orchestration
- Catalog — catalog management including products, categories, and product options
- Catalog Browse — orchestration between a commerce application and microservice APIs
- Content — headless CMS
- Credit Account — creation and management of credit accounts
- Customer — customer profile management and segment creation
- Data Feeds — job management for publishing data to external systems
- Entitlement — entitlement access management across devices
- Fulfillment — shipping cost and option management
- Inventory — inventory checking, reservation, and management
- Menu — data-driven customer-facing navigation menus
- Notification — email and SMS notification delivery
- Offer — offer management and discount calculations
- Order — creation, management, and retrieval of hierarchical order structures
- Order Operations — order orchestration between a commerce application and order and fulfillment APIs
- Payment Transactions — payment method data, transaction history, and payment gateway interactions
- Pricing — price lists, contract pricing, and sales pricing
- Rating & Review — customer ratings and reviews for products and variants
- Search and Indexer — search management with full indexing and event-driven updates
- Shipping — shipping provider management, rate retrieval, and label generation
- Store Credit — integration with Broadleaf's Credit Account Payment Gateway
- Subscription — subscription management with promotional and self-service capabilities
- Vendor — vendor management for marketplace use cases

=== Broadleaf Commerce Cloud ===
Broadleaf Commerce Cloud is a fully managed Platform as a Service (PaaS) offering launched in 2022. It supports deployment on-premise, on external cloud providers including Amazon Web Services, Microsoft Azure, and Google Cloud Platform, or as a fully managed service with dedicated infrastructure, DevOps support, and monitoring. The platform utilizes headless APIs with extension patterns built on Java, Spring Framework, and React.

== Product Features ==
- API-first architecture
- B2B and B2C commerce support
- Cart & checkout
- Catalog management
- Content management
- Customer management
- DevOps and CI/CD pipeline support
- Headless commerce
- Inventory management
- Microservices architecture
- Modules
- Multi-Brand
- Multi-Channel
- Multi-Currency
- Multi-Device
- Multi-Lingual
- Multi-Site
- Multi-Tenant
- Offers & promotions
- Order Management
- Payment gateway integration
- Product management
- Search & browse
- Subscription & marketplace commerce
- Themes
- TM Forum Open API Certified

== Reception ==
Since its launch, Broadleaf Commerce has been reviewed by technology publications including Forrester and Chain Store Age.

== Clients ==
- The Container Store
- Bunn-O-Matic
- iFIT Inc.|Icon Health & Fitness (now iFIT Inc.)
- Major League Baseball
- O'Reilly Auto Parts
