= Francisco Partners =

American private equity firm

Francisco Partners Management, L.P.
- Type: Private
- Industry: Private equity
- Founded: August 1999; 27 years ago in Menlo Park, California, U.S.
- Founders: Dipanjan Deb; Benjamin Ball; Neil Garfinkel; Sanford Robertson; David Stanton
- Headquarters: Letterman Digital Arts Center, San Francisco, California, U.S.
- Key people: Dipanjan Deb (CEO); David Golob (CIO); Ezra Perlman (co-president); Deep Shah (co-president); Tom Ludwig (COO)
- AUM: US$45 billion (2024)
- Number of employees: 116 (2023)
- Subsidiaries: The Weather Company, AdvancedMD, Merative, New Relic, RBMedia, Sumo Logic
- Website: franciscopartners.com

Francisco Partners Management, L.P., doing business as Francisco Partners, is an American private equity firm focused on investments in technology and technology-enabled services businesses. It was founded in 1999 and is headquartered in San Francisco, with offices in London and New York City.

In June 2024, it ranked 27th in Private Equity International's PEI 300 ranking among the world's largest private equity firms. In February 2025, Francisco Partners earned the number one spot on the 2025 HEC Paris Dow Jones "Large Buyout" performance rankings.

== History ==
=== 1999–2011 ===
Francisco Partners was founded in August 1999, in Menlo Park, California, during the emergence of dedicated technology buyout firms. Founders Sanford Robertson, Dipanjan Deb, David Stanton, Benjamin Ball, and Neil Garfinkel came from a variety of private equity firms. Robertson had been the founder of the technology-focused investment bank Robertson Stephens, while Deb left TPG Capital in August 1999, in order to help found the firm. Among its notable early investments, in 2000 the firm paid $375 million in cash to purchase 90% of AMD's communications products division. Francisco Partners then raised $800 million in 2002 to purchase 90% of Global eXchange Services, a unit of the General Electric Company handling sales operations for about 30,000 multinational companies.

The firm purchased NPTest in 2003, the semiconductor-testing unit of Schlumberger, and by the following year Francisco Partners had more than 30 active portfolio companies. Francisco Partners purchased Smart Modular from the Solectron Corporation in 2004, with Smart Modular going public two years later. From 2005 until 2010 the firm owned the software company RedPrairie. In 2006 the company led a leveraged buyout of Metrologic Instruments, which makes laser and holographic-based scanners, and also purchased WatchGuard. The firm purchased API Healthcare in 2008, and by 2010 Francisco Partners' other healthcare holdings included AdvancedMD, Healthland, QuadraMed, and T-System.

=== 2012–2015 ===
By 2012, the Francisco Partners' funds had about $7 billion in capital and invested "exclusively in technology companies across sectors including semiconductors, capital equipment and electronics components." That year the company acquired Ichor Systems, a company specializing in the manufacture of fluid delivery and gas delivery subsystems (a key component of the semiconductor/wafer manufacturing process), from American Industrial Partners, as well as Plex Systems, and Kewill. The firm invested in Paymetric in 2013, selling the company to Vantiv in Atlanta, Georgia four years later. After acquiring the e-commerce services company Avangate in 2013, in 2014 the firm invested in the software company Prosper, with Francisco Partners' executive David Golob becoming a Prosper director. Also in 2014, Francisco Partners invested in the information technology company CoverMyMeds, and paid $120 million for a majority stake, in the controversial spy company NSO Group, sold in 2019. The firm completed raising about $2.9 billion for its fourth fund in 2015. That year, the firm also purchased the California-based analytics company Procera Networks for $240 million and the Israeli workplace management company ClickSoftware Technologies for $438 million. The firm invested in GoodRx in 2015 as well.

=== 2016–2019 ===
Francisco joined with Elliott Management in June 2016 to buy the SonicWall, as well as Quest Software, subsidiaries from Dell as part of the spinoff of Dell Software. The SonicWall investment attracted some controversy in the press, as Francisco Partners had also invested in the competitor WatchGuard, going against norms in the private equity industry. Also in 2016, the firm sold Aesynt to Omnicell for $275 million and took Ichor Holdings public with an initial public offering. In late 2016, Francisco Partners launched its Agility fund, raising approximately $600 million of committed capital to focus on smaller technology deals. Shortly afterwards, Francisco Partners invested in Dynamo Software, Pet Circle, Discovery Education, and myON, the latter of which was sold in 2018. Additional investments in 2016 and 2017 included companies such as SmartBear Software, iconectiv, and others.

In 2017, Francisco Partners sold CoverMyMeds to McKesson Corporation, and Paymetric to Vantiv, and also sold PayLease and Corsair Gaming. Francisco Partners bought, and subsequently sold, James Allen.com in 2017. In June 2017, Francisco Partners also acquired Sandvine, a Canadian public company that was combined with Procera, for $444 million. Francisco Partners was named Private Equity Firm of the Year by Mergers & Acquisitions in 2017. The firm's fifth fund, Francisco Partners V, was formed at the end of 2017 with approximately $4 billion of committed capital. The year after Francisco Partners V's launch, the firm acquired Bomgar Corporation, Renaissance Learning, and LegalZoom. In June 2018, Francisco Partners purchased VeriFone for $3.4 billion. Also in 2018, Blackstone Inc.'s Strategic Capital Group and Goldman Sachs' Petershill program acquired a minority stake in Francisco Partners.

On September 30, 2019, Francisco Partners announced its intent to acquire Orchard Software Corporation, a privately owned company specializing in medical laboratory software.

=== 2020–2021 ===
In June 2020, Francisco Partners wrapped up fundraising for three funds: $7.45 billion for its VI LP fund, $1.5 billion for its Agility II fund and $750 million for Francisco Partners Credit.

In August 2020, Francisco Partners joined Diligent Corporation's Modern Leadership Initiative and pledged to create five new board roles among its portfolio companies for gender or ethnically diverse candidates. On August 31, 2020, the deal closed for Francisco Partners to buy LogMeIn, most known for LastPass password manager, for $4.3 billion together with Evergreen Coast Capital Corp., a private equity affiliate of Elliott Management. In September 2020, Francisco Partners investment GoodRx went public on the Nasdaq, with a market cap of about $19.4 billion.

On October 26, 2020, Francisco Partners announced the acquisition of Forcepoint, a cybersecurity company formerly owned by Raytheon Technologies. Shortly thereafter, the firm bought MyFitnessPal from Under Armour for $345 million. The acquisition completed on December 1, 2020.

On January 11, 2021, Francisco Partners completed acquisition of Forcepoint. In March 2021, the firm entered into a partnership with Zenefits that gave them full control of the company.

Also in early 2021, Francisco Partners acquired MyHeritage for a reported $600 million. In May 2021, Francisco Partners and TPG Capital agreed to acquire cloud-based integration business Boomi from Dell for $4 billion. In July 2021 Francisco Partners acquired STARLIMS from Abbott Informatics. They also completed an acquisition for the EHR vendor OfficeAlly in December 2021. In October 2021, Francisco Partners raised $2.2 billion in its FP Credit Partners II fund.

=== 2022–2025 ===
On January 21, 2022, Francisco Partners acquired health data assets from IBM's Watson Health unit. These assets included Health Insights, MarketScan, Clinical Development, Social Program Management, Micromedex, and imaging software offerings. The assets were valued at a reported $1 billion. In July 2022, raised $13.5 billion for its VII LP fund and $3.3 billion for its Francisco Partners Agility III LP fund.

Also in 2022, Francisco Partners announced the acquisition of bswift from CVS Health. Bswift (stylized as "bswift") is a provider of software and services for benefits and human resources administration.

In May 2023, Francisco Partners completed the acquisition of Sumo Logic for $1.7 billion.

In July 2023, together with TPG Inc., Francisco Partners agreed to acquire web tracking and analytics firm New Relic in an all-cash deal valued at $6.5 billion.

In August 2023, IBM agreed to sell The Weather Company to Francisco Partners for an undisclosed sum. The sale was finalized on February 1, 2024, and the cost was disclosed as $1.1 billion, with $750 million in cash, $100 million deferred over seven years, and $250 million in contingent consideration.

In September 2023, American investment management firm Kohlberg Kravis Roberts sold the audiobook publisher RBmedia to private equity firms H.I.G. Capital and Francisco Partners in a transaction valued at over $1 billion. In December 2023, Francisco Partners completed its purchase of British data security provider Blancco Technology Group, in a deal worth £175 million.

In February 2024, Francisco Partners and TA Associates signed an agreement to become co-controlling shareholders of Orisha, a European software company. In March 2024, Francisco Partners announced the acquisition of Jama Software, an industry leading requirements management and traceability solution provider, for $1.2B. In October 2024, Francisco Partners and Clearlake Capital completed their acquisitions of American software company Synopsys' Software Integrity Group (later renamed Black Duck Software), for $2.1 billion. That same month, Global Payments sold its medical software business, AdvancedMD, to Francisco Partners for $1.13 billion.

In January 2025, Francisco Partners announced the final closing of FP Credit Partners III, L.P., an opportunistic credit fund worth $3.3 billion, which exceeded the target fund amount of $2.3 billion.

In March 2025, Francisco Partners acquired Quorum Software, a provider of energy software worldwide. With this investment, it claims to hope to further strengthen its platform and provide customers with world-class software and services.

In October 2025, Francisco Partners agreed to acquire Jamf in an all cash-deal valued at roughly $2.2 billion.

Francisco Partners has invested in or acquired companies including GoodRx, BeyondTrust, Renaissance Learning, and MyHeritage. Francisco Partners has also held, among others, investments or ownership of ClickSoftware Technologies and Comodo Group.

== Business model ==
Francisco Partners specializes in financing divisional buyouts, taking public companies private, sponsored mergers and acquisitions, growth equity financing, recapitalizations, and restructurings. The firm primarily invests in maturing or mature technology and technology-related companies in areas such as software, internet, healthcare, communications, hardware, and technology services. The firm typically acquires a majority or controlling stake in its portfolio companies, but will occasionally acquire a minority interest in a company with board representation. Specializing in technology buyouts, Francisco has acquired former venture capital-backed companies, as well as many divisions of large conglomerates and IT companies worldwide.

=== Offices and employees ===
The firm is based in San Francisco, California, with additional offices including one in London, United Kingdom. Francisco Partners is currently led by CEO Dipanjan Deb, one of the firm's founders, along with Ezra Perlman and Deep Shah, co-presidents, and David Golob, the chief investment officer.

=== Recognition ===
Francisco Partners has been top ranked by the HEC Paris Dow Jones Private Equity Performance Rankings from 2020 to 2025 and among tech specialist private equity firms, and has a list of portfolio companies that changes frequently.

In June 2022, Francisco were ranked 20th in Private Equity International's PEI 300 ranking of the largest private equity firms in the world. In 2024 the firm was 27th by this same ranking.

Inc. ranked Francisco Partners as "Founder Friendly Investors" for 3 consecutive years, in 2022, 2023 and 2024.
