= Postman, Inc. =

American software company

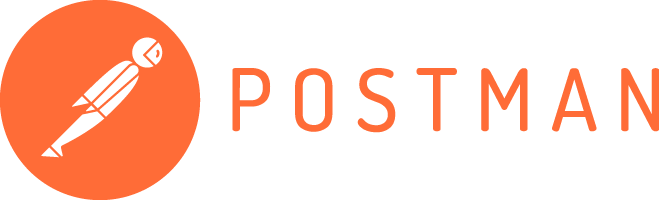
- Original authors: Abhinav Asthana, Ankit Sobti, Abhijit Kane
- Stable release: 12.17 / 29 June 2026; 2 months ago
- Type: Software testing
- License: Proprietary software
- Website: www.postman.com
- Repository: github.com/postmanlabs

Postman, Inc. is an American software company that offers an API testing platform for developers. Postman also maintains the Postman API Network, a directory of over 100,000 public APIs that is listed as the world’s largest such collection. The company is headquartered in San Francisco and maintains additional offices in Tokyo and Bengaluru, where Postman was founded.

In August 2021, Postman raised a $225 million Series D round at a $5.6 billion valuation, making it a unicorn company.

== History ==
Postman started in 2012 in Bangalore as a side project of software engineer Abhinav Asthana, who wanted to simplify API testing while working at Yahoo Bangalore. He named his app Postman – a play on the API request “POST” – and offered it free in the Chrome Web Store. As the app's usage grew to 500,000 users with no marketing, Abhinav recruited former colleagues Ankit Sobti and Abhijit Kane to help create Postman, Inc. The three co-founders lead the company today, with Abhinav as CEO and Ankit as CTO.

In 2017, Postman moved its corporate headquarters from Bangalore to San Francisco.

In 2023, Postman announced it had acquired Akita. In November 2025, Postman acquired liblab, a platform that automates the generation and maintenance of software development kits (SDKs).

In March 2026, Postman launched a rebuilt AI-native platform for the agentic era, featuring Git-connected Workspaces, an API Catalog for managing APIs across organizations, and an AI intelligence layer integrated throughout the platform. The new architecture is Git-native, allowing developers to work on the same branch as their IDE. In 2024, Postman acquired Orbit, a solution for building and managing developer communities.

== Software product ==
The Postman software has tiered pricing, ranging from free options for small teams to paid plans for larger companies and enterprises.

The Postman software's features include:

- Workspaces: Personal, team, partner, and public workspaces allow for API collaboration internally and externally
- API repository: Allows users to store, catalog, and collaborate around API artifacts in a central platform within public, private, or partner networks
- API builder: Helps implement an API design workflow through specifications including OpenAPI, GraphQL, and RAML. Integrates varied source controls, CI/CD, gateways, and APM solutions
- Tools: API client, API design, API documentation, API testing, mock servers, and API detection
- Intelligence: Security warnings, API repository search, workspaces, reporting, API governance

Postman v11 was released in May 2024. The update includes AI-powered features to help developers with API test generation, documentation, debugging, and data visualization.

== Ownership ==
The Postman company is privately held, with funding from Nexus Venture Partners, CRV, Insight Partners, Coatue, Battery Ventures, and Mary Meeker’s BOND. In May 2015, the company raised a $1 million seed round. In August 2021, Postman raised a $225 million Series D round at a $5.6 billion valuation.
