= RAML (software) =

YAML-based language for describing RESTful APIs

- Filename extension: .raml
- Internet media type: application/raml+yaml (Note: Not registered with IANA)
- Developed by: RAML Workgroup
- Latest release: 1.0; May 16, 2016
- Extended from: YAML
- Standard: github.com/raml-org/raml-spec/blob/master/versions/raml-10/raml-10.md/
- Website: raml.org

RESTful API Modeling Language (RAML) is a YAML-based language for describing static APIs (but not REST APIs). It provides all the information necessary to describe APIs on the level 2 of the Richardson Maturity Model. Although designed with RESTful APIs in mind, RAML is not capable of describing APIs that obey all constraints of REST (it cannot describe an API obeying HATEOAS, in particular). It encourages reuse, enables discovery and pattern-sharing and aims for merit-based emergence of best practices.

== History ==
RAML was first proposed in 2013. The initial RAML specification was authored by Uri Sarid, Emiliano Lesende, Santiago Vacas and Damian Martinez, and garnered support from technology leaders like MuleSoft, AngularJS, Intuit, Box, PayPal, Programmable Web and API Web Science, Kin Lane, SOA Software, and Cisco. Development is managed by the RAML Workgroup. The current workgroup signatories include technology leaders from MuleSoft (Uri Sarid, CTO), AngularJS (Misko Hevery, Project Founder), Intuit (Ivan Lazarov, Chief Enterprise Architect), Airware (Peter Rexer, Director of Product - Developer Platform), Programmable Web and API Science (John Musser, Founder), SOA Software (Tony Gullotta, Director of Development), Cisco (Jaideep Subedar, Senior Manager, Product Management - Application Integration Solutions Group), VMware (Kevin Duffey, Senior MTS Engineer), Akamai Technologies (Rob Daigneau, Director of Architecture for Akamai's OPEN API Platform) and Restlet (Jerome Louvel, CTO and Founder). RAML is a trademark of MuleSoft.

Very few existing APIs meet the precise criteria to be classified as RESTful APIs. Consequently, like most API initiatives in the 2010s, RAML has initially focussed on the basics of APIs including resources, methods, parameters, and response bodies that need not be hypermedia. There are plans to move towards more strictly RESTful APIs as the evolution of technology and the market permits.

There are a number of reasons why RAML has broken out from being a proprietary vendor language and has proven interesting to the broader API community:

- RAML has been open-sourced along with tools and parsers for common languages. The development of RAML will be overseen by a steering committee of API and UX practitioners, and there is an emerging ecosystem of third-party tools being developed around RAML
- MuleSoft originally started using Swagger (now OpenAPI Specification), but decided it was best suited to documenting an existing API, not for designing an API from scratch. RAML evolved out of the need to support up-front API design in a succinct, human-centric language
- API descriptions are often verbose and repetitive, which can make them difficult to understand and use, and slow adoption of the APIs. RAML has introduced language features that support structured files and inheritance that address cross-cutting concerns

A new organization, under the sponsorship of the Linux Foundation, called the Open API Initiative was set up in 2015 to standardize the description of HTTP APIs. A number of companies including SmartBear, Google, IBM and Microsoft were founding members. SmartBear donated the Swagger specification to the new group. RAML and API Blueprint are also under consideration by the group.

== Example ==
This is an example RAML file. As with YAML, indentation shows nesting.

  #%RAML 0.8

  title: World Music API
  baseUri: http://example.api.com/{version}
  version: v1
  traits:
    - paged:
        queryParameters:
          pages:
            description: The number of pages to return
            type: number
    - secured: !include http://raml-example.com/secured.yml
  /songs:
    is: [ paged, secured ]
    get:
      queryParameters:
        genre:
          description: filter the songs by genre
    post:
    /{songId}:
      get:
        responses:
          200:
            body:
              application/json:
                schema: |
                  { "$schema": "http://json-schema.org/schema",
                    "type": "object",
                    "description": "A canonical song",
                    "properties": {
                      "title":  { "type": "string" },
                      "artist": { "type": "string" }
                    },
                    "required": [ "title", "artist" ]
                  }
              application/xml:
      delete:
        description: |
          This method will *delete* an **individual song**

Some highlights:

- line 7, 12: defines traits, invoked in multiple places
- line 12: an Include file
- line 13, 14: define a "resource" data type "/songs"; uses previously defined traits
- line 15, 19, 37: defines HTTP methods
- line 25, 36: MIME types.

== API gateways supporting RAML ==
- Apigee
- MuleSoft
- AWS API Gateway by AWS (through AWS API Gateway Importer)
- Akana
- Restlet

Furthermore, you can convert your RAML specification to either OpenAPI or API Blueprint using APIMATIC, thus enabling you to use further API gateways.

== See also ==
- OpenAPI Specification
- MuleSoft
- Representational State Transfer
- YAML
- Java API for RESTful Web Services
- SoapUI
- SOAtest
- Markdown

== Alternative HTTP API Modeling Languages ==
- OpenAPI Specification
- API Blueprint
- WADL
