= APIM =

APIM may refer to:

- API management, in computer science, a way to create API (application programming interface) gateways for back-end services
  - OCP-APIM, an open-source API Management developed by Microsoft and the Open Compute Project
- AEEC (Airlines Electronic Engineering Committee) Project Initiation/Modification
- Asia Pacific Institute of Management
- Ford Sync, Accessory Protocol Interface Module
- Lille Metropole Development Agency
