= Design culture =

Improve Customer Experience

Design culture is an organizational culture focused on approaches that improve customer experiences through design. In every firm, the design culture is of significance as it allows the company to understand users and their needs. Integration of design culture in any organization aims at creating experiences that add value to their respective users. In general, design culture entails undertaking design as the forefront of every operation in the organization, from strategy formulation to execution. Every organization is responsible for ensuring a healthy design culture through the application of numerous strategies. For instance, an organization should provide a platform that allows every stakeholder to engage in design recesses. Consequently, employees across the board need to incorporate design thinking, which is associated with innovation and critical thinking.

Moreover, design culture has many characteristics that create a conducive integration within the work environment. It offers freedom for design experimentation through course corrections. Therefore, individuals involved in design processes learn from their mistakes and eventually develop innovative solutions. Proactivity in design culture has a positive impact on the organization, specifically on decision-making and problem-solving. Design culture allows designers to engage in constructive tasks. In the process, designers can solve problems in an organization and make crucial decisions towards innovations of the organization. Design culture is concerned with the human side of the respective organization. In the recent past, organizations adopted a data-driven mentality with the success of the organization being measured through the level of efficiency in the operations. In contrast, design culture is interested in the participation of humans in determining the success of the organization through the level of innovation facilitated by their involvement. In return, design culture is concerned with improving an organization's culture into a pleasant and change-driven culture.

In the Fourth-Order of Design: A Practical Perspective, Tony Golsby-Smith states that design culture expands beyond physical objects, which makes design humanistic rather than mechanistic. Furthermore, within the context of design culture, Richard Buchanan describes culture as a verb, it can be expressed as an activity, not a “thing.” Therefore, culturing is an activity of ordering, disordering and reordering that everyone can do.

== Developing a design culture ==
Creation of a design culture for an organization leads to a better transformation of the organisation. According to a study conducted by Forrester Research Consulting in the year 2016 to investigate whether the design-led cultures gave companies a significant advantage over their contemporaries. The results showed evidence that most of the enterprises that were analyzed during the research had digital experiences that outpaced the competition. The study proved that focusing on design strengthens an organization from the inside as well as from the outside.

In a design-led enterprise, the design permeates the organisation beyond the product teams that are embedded in the culture and in such organizations, there is always an ambition to do better.

These companies typically support a variety of skills from the more oriented designers to the junior designers or the more tactical designers. The teams use collaborative processes and tools to unify the working groups of the organization. An organization driven by design is more proactive rather than reactive, and it tends to confirm the next challenge rather than wait until the challenge presents itself. This is made possible by the values that are built based on, which is done through collaboration, experimentation, empathy as well as user research.

Furthermore, developing a design culture requires a definition of the design and the necessary resources that will facilitate its integration into the organization. This follows an evaluation of the organisation's stakeholders who will be involved in the design process. The evaluation depends on the organisation's culture, which is the defining aspect of an organization's life. Consequently, identifying the designers to be involved in the designing process requires an in-depth understanding of the purpose of the design towards the organisation's culture and innovation as well.

Additionally, building a design culture entails creating an environment that presents a platform that ensures that every individual obtains solutions to some problems present in the organisation. There exist several factors necessary for developing a design culture in any organisation. Cultivating culture is the first approach to developing design culture. This step entails identifying individuals, and their characters, and including them in the design process. The management involved in the design process needs to set the tone for the organisation's culture. Besides, design culture needs to develop an organisation's value in line with the design and ensure that every member of the design team incorporates them in the field of interest.

Developing a design culture requires the incorporation of skilled personnel, alongside innovative and creative individuals as well. However, identifying such individuals is a process in itself. Therefore, the management needs to integrate an effective interview process that will help in the selection of the best skills. Also, it will require motivation for the personnel involved and alignment with the organisation's values. The design culture needs to foster social capital that is responsible for higher information flow, effective collaboration, and collective action of the team. Therefore, building a design culture should facilitate the creation of employee values, recognition of their achievements, enhance communication in the organisation and establish a firm organisation.

== Addressing markets and society ==
Design culture plays a significant role in marketing systems and the surrounding society. It addresses market externalities and internalizes association with the overall performance of the organisations. In addition, design culture allows an organisation to understand users in society and their needs, hence playing a significant role in shaping the product offering. Through design culture, the organisation supports more strategically oriented designers from the society that ensure effective operation in the business. A design-driven organisation tends to be more proactive in the market by defining challenges and strategically working to improve its overall performance. Design culture facilitates the growth of a firm from tiny startups to legacy enterprises. Therefore, in markets and societies, design culture aims at improving an organisation's output to the excellent quality of products, services, and overall societal relationships.

Additionally, design culture needs to consider the aspects of the surrounding society and ensure that the design process is incorporative of the values and culture that is in sync with the surrounding community. The society plays a significant role in the design culture by presenting skilled personnel who can be recruited into the design process. In relation to society, design culture aims at designing a brand for everyone. I. Moreover, the community presents a ready market for the brands designed by the organisation. Consequently, the branding process should consider all the necessary qualities that will maintain the brand in the market. This is enhanced through consideration of the values defining the surrounding society. Moreover, the organisation's culture should be at par with the societal culture to promote collaboration.

Design culture aims at enhancing collaboration in the market with the respective stakeholders. Therefore, introducing design into the market requires intensive research and planning that will facilitate the production of a brand that fits the requirements for all. The design process needs to be aware of the market trends and branded products to solve an existing problem in the market. In addition, the design process should involve designing a brand that provides a solution to various situations in the society. Addressing the market, design culture is concerned about developing a brand that meets the best competitive qualities. Through innovation, the organisation involved in the design process conducts research on different market trends and comes up with refined approaches to be integrated into the design process. Moreover, the organisation needs to maintain its culture that uniquely defines its operations and products in the market. Concerned about the future trend of the design, the management responsible for the design process need to ensure that necessary qualities are met in the design process.

== Positioning design professions ==
As a guiding truth towards the successful firm organisation, design culture takes a psychological approach to different operations of the business. Positioning design professions entails defining numerous approaches necessary for building a healthy design culture. In addition, it focuses on professional strategies that get prospects and customers preferences that enable a business to stand firm in a competitive market. A design-centric organisation is usually biased against leaving anything to chance. A healthy design culture applies not only to the product but also to the organisation itself. Products usually reflect the structure as well as the character of the organisation that is responsible for their production. A well-designed enterprise is capable of producing well-designed products and services. In a healthy design culture, everyone has a feeling of empowerment towards participation in the design process. Employees are usually encouraged to carry out experimentations with the understanding that they will often lead to mistakes, and this should not be a hindrance.

Design culture has innovation as one of its core components. Therefore, the design profession is crucial in the design process as it incorporates necessary branding skills, design skills and knowledge of the design process. The process of cultivating culture requires skills necessary for analysing the surrounding society and determining the required skills for the design process. Setting the tone for an organisation is a professional approach that requires the development of an organisation's values. The design management needs to demonstrate knowledge and an understanding of the conduct of the design team and the level of innovation necessary for the design process.

Furthermore, positioning the design profession requires increased diversity that facilitates innovation. Gender diversity should be maintained in determining the team that will be involved in the design process. In addition, diversity brings heterogenous individuals together who have varying skills, creativity and knowledge that help in branding different products. Branding a product for everyone in society requires extensive research. As a result, the research requires a professional approach that will help in identifying the cultural aspects defining the society. Moreover, identification of the market trends requires in-depth analysis approaches that are in line with design professions. Therefore, the design management team need to ensure an effective and strong position in the design culture that enhances innovation in the design process

== Locating design culture ==
Effective design culture has to be made with intention and put into practice consistently. This requires the definition of approaches necessary for locating design culture. Discovering design culture is facilitated by the need to obtain a solution to a given challenge or the need to champion problem-solving approaches. Locating design culture is done through experimentation, collaboration, user research and empathy. It is a common characteristic for many companies to build a third design culture through trial and error. For example, a company such as Apple has been fine-tuning its design culture for about three decades. Locating design culture require an effective definition of the characteristics of a robust design culture. It requires frequent experimentation that allow individuals to explore as many solutions as possible that result in successful launches. In addition, locating design culture entails implementation of a system that provides answers for questions raised concerning the design culture. Moreover, it involves locating different tools that encourage collaboration allowing a given team to formulate plans, design presentations and work together for successful design culture. Concerning idea generation, it is a norm for every organisation to keep coming up with new ideas now and then, and this allows the organisation to iterate and even receive feedback more efficiently and in a short time
