= Bhumi =

Bhumi may refer to:

- Bhūmi, Hindu goddess of the earth, and representation of earth as a classical element in Hindu tradition
- Bhūmi (Buddhism), the ten stages a Bodhisattva advances through in the path to become a Buddha
- Bhumi (organisation), a Chennai-based youth volunteer non-profit organization
- Bangabhumi, a separatist movement to create a Hindu country using southwestern Bangladesh, envisioned by Banga Sena

== See also ==
- Bhoomi (disambiguation)
- Bumi (disambiguation)
- BHU (disambiguation)
- Dell Boomi, a technology company named after the Hindu goddess
