= API Healthcare =

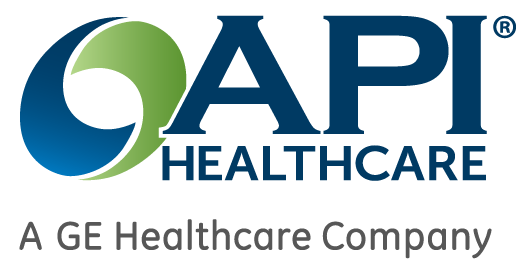
- Type: Private
- Industry: Health care
- Founded: 1982; 44 years ago
- Headquarters: Hartford, Wisconsin, United States
- Products: Health care technology Software
- Revenue: US$80 million
- Number of employees: 200 (August 2018)
- Parent: symplr
- Website: www.apihealthcare.com

API Healthcare is based in Hartford, Wisconsin, and is a developer of healthcare-specific workforce management software. The company is best known for providing workforce management solutions to the healthcare industry.

As of August 2018, the company had about 200 employees.

== History ==
API Healthcare was founded in 1982 by Luis Garcia and is based in Hartford, Wisconsin. Formerly known as API Software, Inc. the company was purchased by Francisco Partners, a private equity firm headquartered in San Francisco, in November 2008. Before that, Luis Garcia and his wife Iris had run the company since 1982. The company changed its name to API Healthcare in February 2009.

In December 2009, API Healthcare acquired the Addison, Texas–based company Clearview Staffing Software, a provider of workforce management solutions. In 2017, this contingent staffing division was acquired by HealthcareSource.

An intended merger between API Healthcare and Kronos, Inc., a Massachusetts-based workforce management vendor, was announced in February 2011. That merger was abandoned in April 2011 following antitrust concerns from the U.S. Department of Justice.

In February 2012, API Healthcare acquired Concerro, a San Diego–based provider of staffing solutions delivered via a Software as a Service (SaaS) model. This acquisition enabled the company to provide its software to home health care, retail clinics, a long-term care facilities, and similar.

In February 2014, API Healthcare was acquired by General Electric, under the GE Healthcare Division. GE relocated the company’s operations from Hartford to GE’s Wauwatosa campus in 2016.

In April 2018, Veritas Capital acquired GE's revenue-cycle, ambulatory care and workforce management software unit (formerly API Healthcare) for $1.05 billion in cash. In August 2018, it was announced that API Healthcare was returning to its former headquarters in Hartford.

In April 2019, Veritas sold the API Healthcare unit to symplr, a provider of compliance and credentialing solutions for healthcare organizations. The deal amounted to approximately 300 million dollars.

== Products ==
API Healthcare offers integrated workforce management technology to the healthcare industry. It offers its solutions to monitor and control labor costs, address staffing challenges, automate time and attendance, track and manage human resource data, manage payroll in real time, and base workloads on patient classification.

Solutions for health systems include time and attendance, staffing and scheduling, talent management, human resources and payroll, business analytics, and patient classification solutions for healthcare providers.
