= Bumi =

Bumi may refer to:

- Bumi River of Papua New Guinea
- Bumi Hills, a group of hills and a resort in Zimbabwe
- Bumi Thomas, a British-Nigerian musician
- Bumi Resources, a mining company of Indonesia
- Asia Resource Minerals, formerly known as Bumi plc, an international mining group
- The name of two characters in Avatar: The Last Airbender and The Legend of Korra

== See also ==
- Bhumi (disambiguation)
- Bhoomi (disambiguation)
- Buumi, a royal title in several pre-colonial kingdoms of Senegal
- Boomi, New South Wales, a town in Australia
  - Boomi River
