= AdvancedMD =

American medical software company

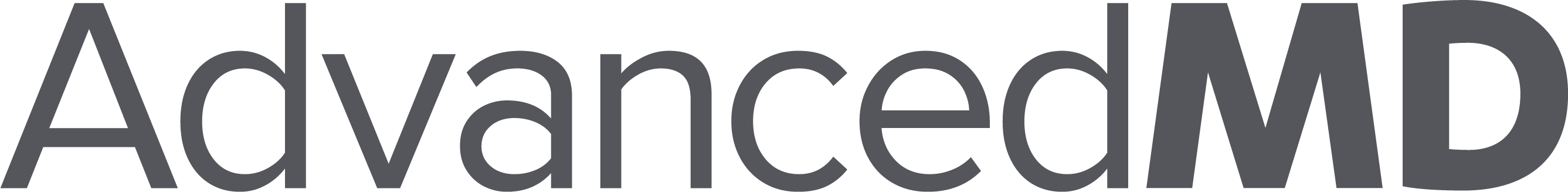
- Type: Private
- Industry: Health informatics Practice management software Software as a service
- Predecessor: Perfect Practice.MD
- Founded: 1999; 27 years ago
- Headquarters: South Jordan, Utah, United States
- Area served: United States
- Key people: Amanda Sharp (CEO)
- Products: Electronic health record software Practice management Medical billing Telemedicine
- Services: Revenue cycle management Patient engagement
- Owner: Francisco Partners (2008–2011); ADP (2011–2015); Marlin Equity Partners (2015–2018); Global Payments (2018–2024); Francisco Partners (2024–present)
- Website: advancedmd.com

AdvancedMD is a cloud-based software-as-a-service (SaaS) company that provides practice management, medical billing, and electronic health record (EHR) solutions to independent medical practices in the United States. Based in South Jordan, Utah, it was acquired by Global Payments in 2018 for $700 million, and in late 2024 it was sold to the private equity firm Francisco Partners for approximately $1.1 billion.

== Platform ==
AdvancedMD's EHR platform is a cloud-based system that enables healthcare providers to access patient records from various locations. It unifies various functions needed in a medical practice, including patient scheduling and practice management, clinical documentation (EHR), patient engagement tools, and billing/collections.

AdvancedMD also provides mobile access to everyday clinical tasks, including through a selection of apps for iOS and Android devices.

The platform includes customizable templates for different medical specialties, allowing for customization at the note and subnote levels. The EHR component features customizable templates for different specialties and a visual task management module called “Task Donuts” to help staff prioritize work. The system supports electronic integrations (including digital faxing and e-prescribing) and analytics tools that provide insights into operational efficiency and support Clinical Quality Reporting.

The integrated billing system includes a one-click payment feature and interfaces with payment processing terminals for collecting copays and fees. The billing software also integrates with credit card processing systems, allowing charges to be automatically posted to a patient's account after a card swipe.

== History ==
AdvancedMD was founded in 1999 as Perfect Practice.MD, which was later rebranded in 2000 to AdvancedMD following the release of their earliest cloud-based medical billing and practice management platform. This early investment in a web-based solutions set them apart in a field otherwise dominated by complex self-hosted "client/server" EHRs, fueling the company's rapid early growth. In 2008, it was acquired by Francisco Partners, a San Francisco-based private equity firm.

In 2010, a year before purchasing PracticeOne, AdvancedMD introduced the AdvancedBiller billing service partner program for additional billing services support. In March 2011, AdvancedMD was acquired by ADP and was renamed as ADP AdvancedMD.

In 2012, AdvancedMD expanded its revenue cycle management software by acquiring PhyLogic Healthcare RCM. Additionally, they introduced an Apple iPad App and made iPad Charge available for mobile charge capture.

In May 2013, AdvancedMD launched a new website called MyICD-10 to assist medical practices in preparing for the transition to the ICD-10 coding system, which was scheduled to take effect on October 1, 2014. In 2015, AdvancedMD was acquired by Marlin Equity Partners and began operating as a stand-alone company.

In 2016, the company expanded its platform by launching a patient engagement suite (branded “AdvancedPatient”) and introducing a telemedicine capability integrated with its EHR software, allowing physicians to conduct follow-up visits remotely. The following year, in 2017, they added special editions of AdvancedMD specifically to serve mental health providers and physical therapy practices. In August 2018, a month after purchasing NueMD software with proprietary clearinghouse, AdvancedMD was acquired for $700 million by Global Payments.

In October 2024, Global Payments agreed to sell AdvancedMD to Francisco Partners for $1.125 billion, returning AdvancedMD to ownership by the firm that had first acquired it in 2008.The transaction was completed in December.

In early 2025, following the sale, AdvancedMD’s then-president, Amanda Sharp, was named Chief Executive Officer. In mid-2025 AdvancedMD began adding AI-integrations to their EHR platform, such as the ability to automatically generate SOAP notes and post-visit summary documents.

== Awards ==
In 2023, EMR Finder ranked AdvancedMD among the top five EMR systems for large practices. The following year, Forbes Advisor included AdvancedMD in its list of best medical billing software of 2024 and a TechRadar review recognized it as one of the best EHR providers of 2024.
