= Blancco Technology Group =

British data security provider

- Type: Private
- Industry: Data security provider
- Founded: 2016; 10 years ago
- Headquarters: United Kingdom
- Products: Mobile device diagnostics; Secure data erasure
- Owner: Francisco Partners; (2023–present)
- Website: www.blancco.com

Blancco Technology Group is a British company and a global provider of device diagnostic and data wiping software products. Originally known as Regenersis plc, the firm was formed in 2016 following a number of mergers and acquisitions. After acquiring the Finnish company, Blancco Oy, Regenersis disposed of its original repair division to focus on software and renamed itself Blancco Technology Group plc.

The company has two subsidiaries: Blancco (data erasure) and SmartChk (mobile diagnostics). It employs 240 people worldwide across North America, Europe, Asia and Australia. The company is headquartered in Alpharetta, Georgia in the United States. On December 5, 2023, it was acquired by the private equity firm Francisco Partners for approximately £175 million.

== History ==
Blancco Technology Group started life as Regenersis plc, a provider of diagnostics, repair and data erasure services to the consumer electronics industry.

=== Regeneris ===
Regeneris itself began as Fonebank. Regenersis filed for IPO in 2005 as a public company on the London Stock Exchange. In the same year, it acquired Intec Group (Intec Cellular Services and Intec Distribution). In 2009, Regenersis bought Total Repair Solutions and TRS' Scottish outfit, in a deal that would see it become Scotland's second largest electronics employer.

In 2011, the gadget repair group, was based in Oxford with 1,100 staff in Scotland at two locations. It repaired products, such as mobile phones, laptops and tablets, satnavs, set-top boxes and televisions, for companies under contracts. In 2011, Regeneris was pursued by Hanover Investors, who increased their share in the company to 14%. Regeneris's chair, Jeff Hewitt and non-executive directors, David Holland and David Gilbert, moved aside and were replaced with Hanover founding partner, Matthew Peacock as chair and Andrew Lee as an executive. Three years after Hanover's increased stake, shares prices in Regeneris had increased five-fold.

In March 2014, Regenersis bought Blancco Oy (Blancco Ltd), a market leader in data erasure software, cited an expected increase in the demand for data erasure services, particularly hoping to capitalise on the implementation of the European General Data Protection Regulation which was expected to increase the compliance burden for companies holding consumer data.

=== Blancco ===
In 1997, Janne Tervo and Kim Väisänen co-founded Carelian Innovation Ltd. The company's first data erasure product, Blancco Data Cleaner, was released in 1999. In 2000, Carelian Innovations Ltd. changed its name to Blannco Oy.

Sun Microsystems and Blancco formed a partnership in 2007 to deliver data erasure. In 2007, Blancco was approved and included in the NATO Information Assurance Product Catalogue (NIAPC). The company expanded its product line in 2008 with the introduction of the Blancco 4.5 client series for added server support, and the Data Center Edition, which enables safe reuse of the hard drives in mass storage environments for clients such as Sun, HP and EMC that need deep data expunging. The company released Blancco Mobile for smartphone erasure in 2012. In 2011, Blancco LUN was launched and in 2012 Blancco 5 and Management Console 3 were released. The company also acquired DBAN in 2012 and received Common Criteria certification in that same year.

Blancco Oy was acquired by Regenersis in April 2014.

=== Divestment ===
In 2016, after acquiring Blancco, Regenersis appointed separate chief executives for its after-market services and digital security businesses as it was looking to sell the former.

== Operations ==
Blancco Technology Group operates two distinct business units: Blancco (data erasure) and SmartChk (mobile diagnostics). It employs 240 people worldwide across North America, Europe, Asia and Australia. The company is headquartered in Alpharetta, GA, United States.

=== Blancco ===
Blancco Oy (Blancco Ltd) is an international data security company that specializes in data erasure and computer reuse for corporations, governments and computer remarketing companies. Founded and headquartered in Joensuu, Finland, the company operates from offices across Europe, North America, Asia, and Australasia. Blancco is a wholly-owned subsidiary of Blancco Technology Group.

Blancco's data wiping products scale from a single, reusable PC tools to software for mass storage environments and data centers.
