= CoverMyMeds =

US healthcare software company

- Type: Subsidiary
- Industry: Health informatics
- Founded: Twinsburg, Ohio, United States (2008)
- Founders: Sam Rajan; Matt Scantland
- Headquarters: Columbus, United States
- Key people: Nathan Mott, President
- Owner: McKesson Corporation
- Website: covermymeds.com

CoverMyMeds is a healthcare software company that creates software to automate the prior authorization process used by some health insurance companies in the United States. The company was founded in 2008 and has offices in Ohio. Since early 2017, it has operated as a wholly owned subsidiary of McKesson Corporation.

== History ==
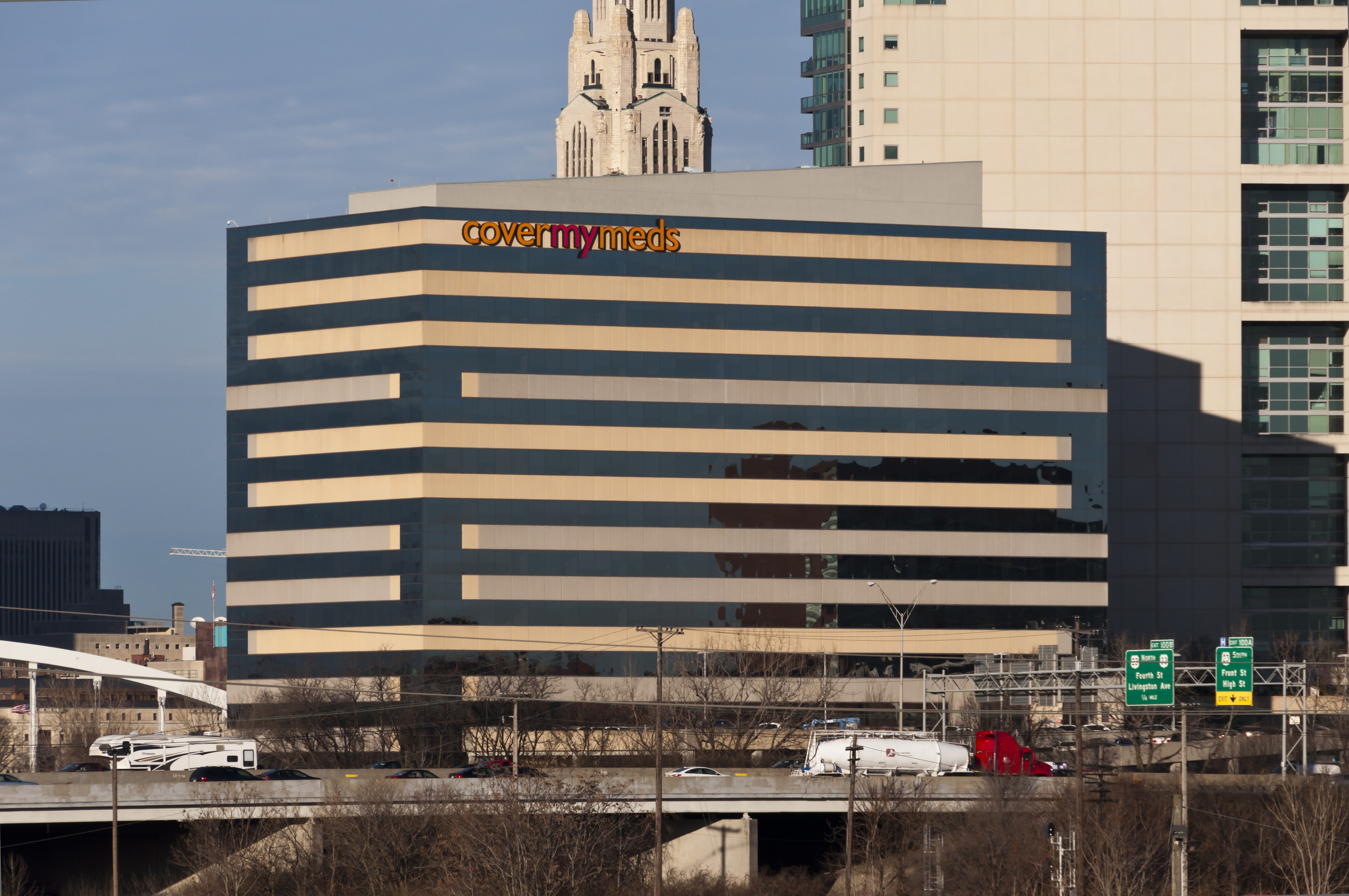
2 Miranova Place building, which formerly housed CoverMyMeds' Columbus offices

CoverMyMeds was founded in 2008 by pharmacist Sam Rajan and developer Matt Scantland to create automated prior authorization software. That same year, JumpStart Ventures invested $250,000 into CoverMyMeds. By 2011, CoverMyMeds had raised a total of $1 million.

In 2008, in response to a lack of space from the growing number of employees, CoverMyMeds opened a new office in Columbus, Ohio and moved most of its technical employees there. In the years following, CoverMyMeds saw most of its growth in Columbus, benefited by tax credits offered by the state of Ohio and city of Columbus. As of 2014, 120 of CoverMyMeds' 150 employees were in Columbus. In a 2014 Columbus Business First interview with co-founder Matt Scantland, when asked which city is considered the headquarters of CoverMyMeds, Scantland stated, "Both Columbus and Twinsburg serve critical functions in our company. Relative to our daily operations, we don't really think about having a 'headquarters.'"

In 2014, Francisco Partners invested an undisclosed minority stake in CoverMyMeds. That same year, CoverMyMeds was offered government tax credits in exchange for growth plans. These growth plans included creating 116 new jobs in the following years. During this time, CoverMyMeds moved its office in Columbus from the Arena District to a larger space in Columbus' Scioto Mile at 2 Miranova building.

In November 2014, CoverMyMeds' software was being used by 45,000 pharmacies and 260,000 prescribers. By August 2015, CoverMyMeds had over 400,000 prescribers use it, and as of June 2016, has over 500,000.

In early 2016, CoverMyMeds announced they would be moving their Twinsburg office to Highland Hills, Ohio. The Highland Hills office consists of 15,000 square feet of space, and would be three times larger than the space in Twinsburg. The new space would allow CoverMyMeds to hire 25 new employees. The office opened on January 11, 2016, primarily occupied by analysts and financial employees.

In early 2017, CoverMyMeds was acquired by McKesson for $1.1 Billion.

In late 2018, CoverMyMeds announced the building and development of a new campus in Franklinton, Columbus, Ohio. The new campus is a multimillion-dollar facility designed by the architect firm, Perkins+Will's Dallas studio. In June of 2025, CoveryMyMeds acquired RxLightning, a digital platform for specialty medication access. It helps providers and care teams complete and track workflows like specialty drug enrollment and related access steps that historically require significant back-and-forth communication.

== Product ==
CoverMyMeds' software automates the prior authorization process used by some health insurance companies in the United States, helping to save time and eliminate paperwork. Traditionally, prior authorization required phone calls and faxes between multiple parties; CoverMyMeds circumvents this by automating the process. Involved parties are able to view the status of the authorization as it progresses.
