= MyCujoo =

Swiss video streaming platform

- Industry: Sports broadcasting
- Founded: 2014
- Founder: Pedro Presa; João Presa
- Headquarters: Zürich, Switzerland
- Areas served: Global
- Owner: DAZN

MyCujoo was a video streaming platform providing live and on-demand broadcast of football matches, sports events, and highlights. MyCujoo provided a platform and channels for teams, leagues, and federations to broadcast their own content including streaming live using a cellphone.

== History ==
MyCujoo was founded in 2014, and launched in 2015 by brothers Pedro and João Presa. According to the company, beginning with its inaugural partnership with FC Zürich Frauen, MyCujoo grew from streaming 56 games in 2015 to over 300 by the end of the first quarter in 2017, and by the end of the year approximately 4,200 games had been broadcast from 60 countries with roughly 40 million viewers.

Since its partnership with the Asian Football Confederation (AFC) launched in 2016, there have been 1,544 matches streamed from AFC member association territories, reaching nearly 19 million viewers in over 122 countries. In October 2018, the company was the subject of an Amazon Studios documentary. In November 2018, it was described by the Financial Times as one of Europe's 100 digital champions.

In January 2019, it was announced that MyCujoo had concluded a five-year agreement with the International Hockey Federation to provide a dedicated OTT solution, and had been the subject of investment from Sapphire Ventures.

In November 2020, both MyCujoo's direct to consumer live football streaming platform and business to business streaming MyCujoo Live Services were acquired by Eleven Sports. In June 2021 , the direct to consumer platform transformed into a global live and on-demand sports and entertainment platform. In September 2022, Eleven Sports was acquired by direct-to-consumer live football streaming platform DAZN.

In July 2023, Eleven's global OTT was discontinued, ending MyCujoo's position as a direct to consumer streaming platform.
