= Janmabhoomi =

Janmabhoomi may refer to:

- Ram Janmabhoomi, a place in Ayodhya, India; believed to be the birthplace of the Hindu god Rama
- Janmabhumi, an Indian Malayalam-language daily newspaper
- Janmabhoomi (Gujarati newspaper), an Indian Gujarati-language daily newspaper
- Dainik Janambhumi, a daily newspaper in India
- Janmabhoomi (1936 film), an Indian Hindi-language film
- Janmabhoomi (1969 film), an Indian Malayalam-language film

== See also ==
- Bhoomi (disambiguation)
- Krishna Janmasthan Temple Complex, in Mathura, India; believed to be the birthplace of the Hindu god Krishna
