= Sumo Logic =

U.S. information technology company

Sumo Logic, Inc.

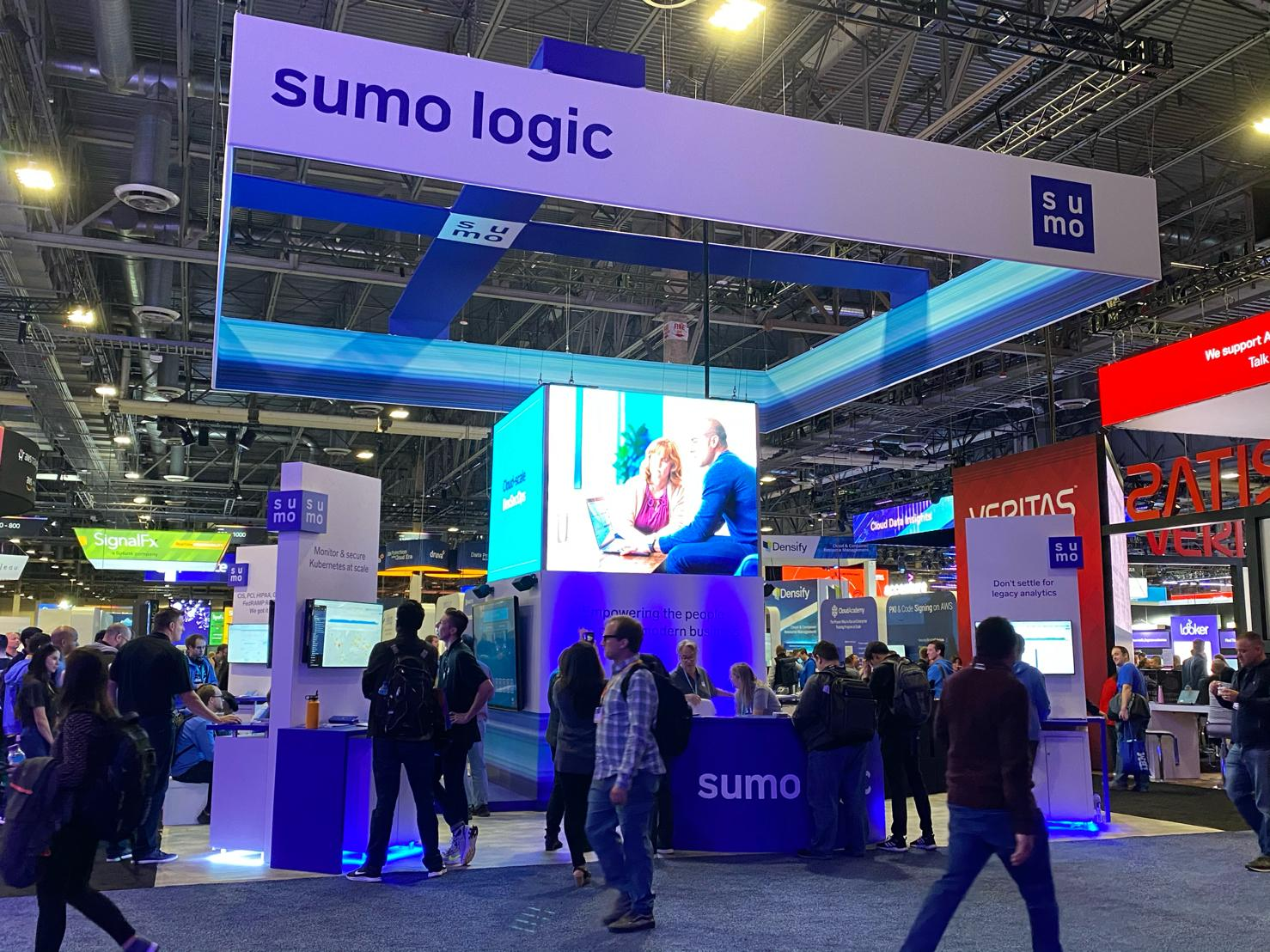
- Type: Private
- Traded as: Nasdaq: SUMO (2020–2023)
- Industry: Computer software; Security management; Enterprise software
- Founded: 2010; 16 years ago
- Founders: Kumar Saurabh; Christian Beedgen
- Headquarters: Redwood City, California, U.S.
- Key people: Chris Malone (CEO); Russell Rosa (CRO); Keith Kuchler (Chief Product & Technology Officer)
- Services: IT operations, security analytics, cloud SIEM, data analytics
- Owner: Francisco Partners
- Number of employees: 800
- Website: sumologic.com

Sumo Logic, Inc. is a cloud-based data analytics company, focusing on cybersecurity, security analytics and observability. It provides log management and analytics services based on artificial intelligence.

Sumo Logic's service is powered by its patented technologies, including AI/ML, Sumo Logic Log Analytics Platform, and Sumo Logic security innovations. Sumo Logic was taken private by investment firm Francisco Partners in May 2023. Francisco Partners acquired the company for $1.7 billion. As of 2026, its CEO is Chris Malone.

== History ==
Sumo Logic was founded in 2010 by ArcSight veterans Kumar Saurabh and Christian Beedgen.

While Sumo Logic remained in stealth mode for two years, it unveiled its cloud-based log management platform with Series B funding of $15 million in January 2012.

Sumo Logic closed a Series E funding round in June 2015, bringing its total VC backing to $160.5 million.

In 2016, Sumo Logic launched a data analytics platform that unifies logs and metrics to analyze structured metrics data and unstructured log data in real-time through graphical, interactive dashboards.

At the AWS 2017 conference, Sumo Logic presented its machine data analytics service which combines the analytics of Docker and Kubernetes. The service streamlines data ingestion for Sumo Logic's machine data analytics service hosted on Amazon Web Services.

On June 27, 2017, the company closed its Series F round for $75 million.

In 2018, Sumo Logic announced its integration expansion with Google Cloud Platform, GCP applications and TensorFlow. In September 2018, Sumo Logic announced the addition of cloud SIEM to its platform.

In May 2019, Sumo Logic announced a $110 million Series G investment.

On September 17, 2020, Sumo Logic debuted on the NASDAQ stock exchange in its initial public offering as a public company.

In 2021, evidence showed that, while Sumo Logic was neither a party to the criminal case nor any charges or claims were ever made against the company, former advisor Michael Kail intentionally misled Sumo Logic into believing there was no conflict of interest between Kail and Netflix. The US Department of Justice convicted Kail on a number of counts related to the kickback agreements received amongst multiple vendors, Sumo Logic being one.

In February 2023, investment firm Francisco Partners agreed to acquire Sumo Logic for $1.7 billion. The transaction finalized and the company was taken private in May 2023.

Prior to going private, Sumo Logic received funding from Accel Partners, DFJ Growth, Greylock Partners, Institutional Venture Partners, Sequoia Capital, Sapphire Ventures, Sutter Hill Ventures, angel investor Shlomo Kramer, Battery Ventures, Tiger Global Management and Franklin Templeton.

== Technology and acquisitions ==
In 2019, the company acquired JASK to combine its security operations center (SOC) with Sumo Logic's security information and event management (SIEM) services. In April 2019, Sumo Logic launched a bidirectional integration for Atlassian’s OpsGenie incident alert service, allowing users to create and analyze alerts and incident data.

It expanded into security orchestration, automation, and response (SOAR) technology and monitoring workflow software with the acquisitions of DFLabs and Sensu in 2021. That same year, the company announced DevSecOps tools on its platform.

Sumo Logic's architecture features an elastic exabyte scale platform that collects, manages, and analyzes enterprise log data, reducing millions of log lines into operational and security insights in real time. Its elastic processing is used to collect, manage, and analyze log data, regardless of type, volume, or location. A cloud-based approach overcomes the inherent problems of premises-based solutions, including limits on scalability, inefficient or haphazard analysis, and uncontrolled costs. Sumo Logic is built around a globally distributed data retention architecture that keeps all log data available for instant analysis, eliminating the need for an enterprise to manage the cost and complexity of data archiving, backups and restoration. The service is entirely cloud-based and maintenance-free.

In 2025, Sumo Logic Dojo AI, an agent-powered security operations service, was launched. Dojo AI uses three agents (Mobot, Query Agent and Summary Agent) to automate routine tasks and streamline security operations.
