= Starlims =

American software company

STARLIMS Corporation
- Formerly: Abbott Informatics (2014–2021)
- Type: Private
- Industry: Software, IT
- Founded: 1986; 40 years ago
- Founders: Itschak Friedman; Dinu Toiba
- Headquarters: Hollywood, Florida, U.S.
- Key people: Max Schultz (CEO)
- Owner: Turn/River Capital
- Website: www.starlims.com

STARLIMS Corporation (STARLIMS) is a portfolio company of Turn/River Capital that provides web-based laboratory information management systems.

== History ==
The company was founded by Itschak Friedman and Dinu Toiba in Israel in 1986, and developed and sold LIMS software. The company was renamed to STARLIMS. By 2005, the company's software was installed at the US Centers for Disease Control and Prevention and in systems of state health authorities in 12 US states. The company held its IPO in the US in 2007. Friedman was CEO until the company was acquired by Abbott Laboratories in 2009 for $123 million; at that time the company had 160 employees and most of its operations and sales were in the US, the UK, and Hong Kong. By the time of the sale, STARLIMS was offered as a web application. Abbott intended to fold STARLIMS' products offerings into its other health information technology businesses in an effort to improve its clinical diagnostics business. In 2014, Abbott changed the subsidiary's name from STARLIMS to Abbott Informatics. In July 2021 Abbott sold STARLIMS to Francisco Partners.

In August 2023, it was announced STARLIMS had acquired the London-based R&D Electronic Laboratory Notebook (ELN) platform, Labstep for an undisclosed amount.

In January 2026, it was announced that Francisco Partners had sold Starlims to private-equity firm Turn/River Capital for an undisclosed amount.
