= BHU (disambiguation) =

BHU is an abbreviation for Banaras Hindu University, Varanasi, India.

BHU may also refer to:

- The Kingdom of Bhutan, IOC and UNDP code
- Baltimore Hebrew University, now part of Towson University, Towson, Maryland, U.S.
- Bhavnagar Airport, the IATA code for the airport in India
- Banco Hipotecario del Uruguay, a Uruguayan mortgage bank
- Barrett Hodgson University, Karachi, Pakistan
- Behavioral Health Unit, also known as a psychiatric unit
- Bhunjia language, ISO 639-3 code bhu

== See also ==
- Bhumi (disambiguation)
