= Degreed =

E-learning platform

Degreed, Inc.
- Industry: Workforce upskilling
- Founded: 2012
- Founders: David Blake (Executive Chairman of the Board); Eric Sharp (former CTO / Advisor); David Wiley
- Headquarters: Pleasanton, CA Salt Lake City, UT
- Key people: David Blake (CEO); Chris McCarthy (Strategic Advisor and Board Member); Marc Eberhart (CMO); Nate Kimmons (Chief of Staff); Kelly Palmer (CLO)
- Products: Degreed for Me; Degreed for Enterprise; Degreed Skill Certification
- Website: degreed.com

Degreed is an education technology company. Degreed is based in San Francisco, CA, with offices in Salt Lake City, UT, New York, London, Brisbane, Australia and Leiden, The Netherlands.

== History ==
David Blake, David Wiley, and Eric Sharp founded Degreed in March 2012.

In November 2012, Degreed launched an early Beta to 20,000 users who joined as 'Founding Scholars' to the platform. In January 2013, following a crowdfunded launch, Degreed launched to the public.

In the fall of 2014, the company launched the Degreed for Enterprise platform.

== Acquisitions ==
In March 2016, Degreed acquired European education technology startup, Gibbon.

In June 2018, Degreed acquired New York–based online learning provider, Pathgather.

In December 2019, Degreed acquired London-based total talent platform, Adepto.

== Reception ==
According to the director of Georgetown University's Center on Education and the Workforce, Anthony Carnevale, services such as Degreed only take into account the time spent learning, rather than how much has actually been learnt.
