= Commercetools =

Headless commerce platform

commercetools
- Type: Private
- Industry: E-commerce
- Founded: 2006; 20 years ago Munich, Germany
- Founders: Dirk Hoerig; Denis Werner
- Headquarters: Munich, Germany
- Number of locations: 7 (2026)
- Area served: Worldwide
- Key people: Doug McNary (CEO); Dirk Hoerig (co-founder and chief innovation officer)
- Number of employees: 600+ (2022)
- Website: commercetools.com

commercetools is a Munich-based company that offers a cloud-based headless commerce platform that provides APIs to power e-commerce sales and similar functions for large businesses. Both the company and platform are called commercetools. Through its investor REWE Group it is associated with the omnichannel order fulfillment software solutions provider fulfillmenttools and the payment transactions provider paymenttools. commercetools is a founding member of the MACH Alliance.

== History ==
commercetools was founded by Dirk Hoerig and Denis Werner in 2006. It launched its platform in 2013. In 2014, commercetools was wholly bought by REWE Digital, part of Germany’s REWE Group. Hoerig is credited with coining the term "headless commerce".

In 2018, commercetools announced a $17 million investment to support its international expansion. It expanded into the U.K market in 2019 with the opening of its London office. In 2020, commercetools established a presence in Australia, with a team in Melbourne and a data center in Sydney.

In 2019, commercetools raised $145 million from venture capital firm Insight Partners. Insight Partners' managing directors Richard Wells and Matt Gatto joined commercetools' board of directors as part of the deal. At the same time, commercetools was spun out by REWE. REWE remains a significant shareholder.

In January 2021, commercetools partnered with car manufacturer Volkswagen Group to use the platform for its group brands, including Volkswagen, Bentley, Porsche and Audi.

In May 2021, REWE group announced additional investment into commercetools to fund growth into the Chinese market.

In September 2021, commercetools raised $140m in its series C round, led by venture capital firm Accel, valuing the company at $1.9 billion.

In November 2021, commercetools acquired Frontastic for an undisclosed amount.

In July 2024, co-founder Dirk Hoerig stepped down as CEO and became the company's chief innovation officer. Andrew Burton, previously an executive at Rapid7, was named CEO.

According to Burton, commercetools became profitable in 2025 and its annual recurring revenue exceeded US$100 million. In October 2025, Burton left the company and Doug McNary became CEO. The change followed workforce reductions at the company.

The company added support for agentic commerce standards such as the Model Context Protocol and Stripe's Agentic Commerce Protocol, and in January 2026 released AgenticLift, a product that connects existing commerce systems to AI assistants including ChatGPT, Google Gemini and Microsoft Copilot without replatforming. Gartner named commercetools a Leader in its 2025 Magic Quadrant for Digital Commerce. According to the company, more than 500 businesses used its platform as of 2026.
