= Apigee =

API management tools and predictive analytics softwares provider

Apigee Corp.
- Formerly: Sonoa Systems
- Company type: Subsidiary
- Traded as: Nasdaq: APIC
- Industry: Internet; Computer software
- Founded: July 2004; 21 years ago, in Santa Clara, California, U.S.
- Founder: Raj Singh; Ravi Chandra
- Successor: Google Cloud
- Headquarters: San Jose, California
- Revenue: ▲US$ 68,607,000 (2015); US$ 92,027,000 (2016)
- Parent: Google
- Website: apigee.com

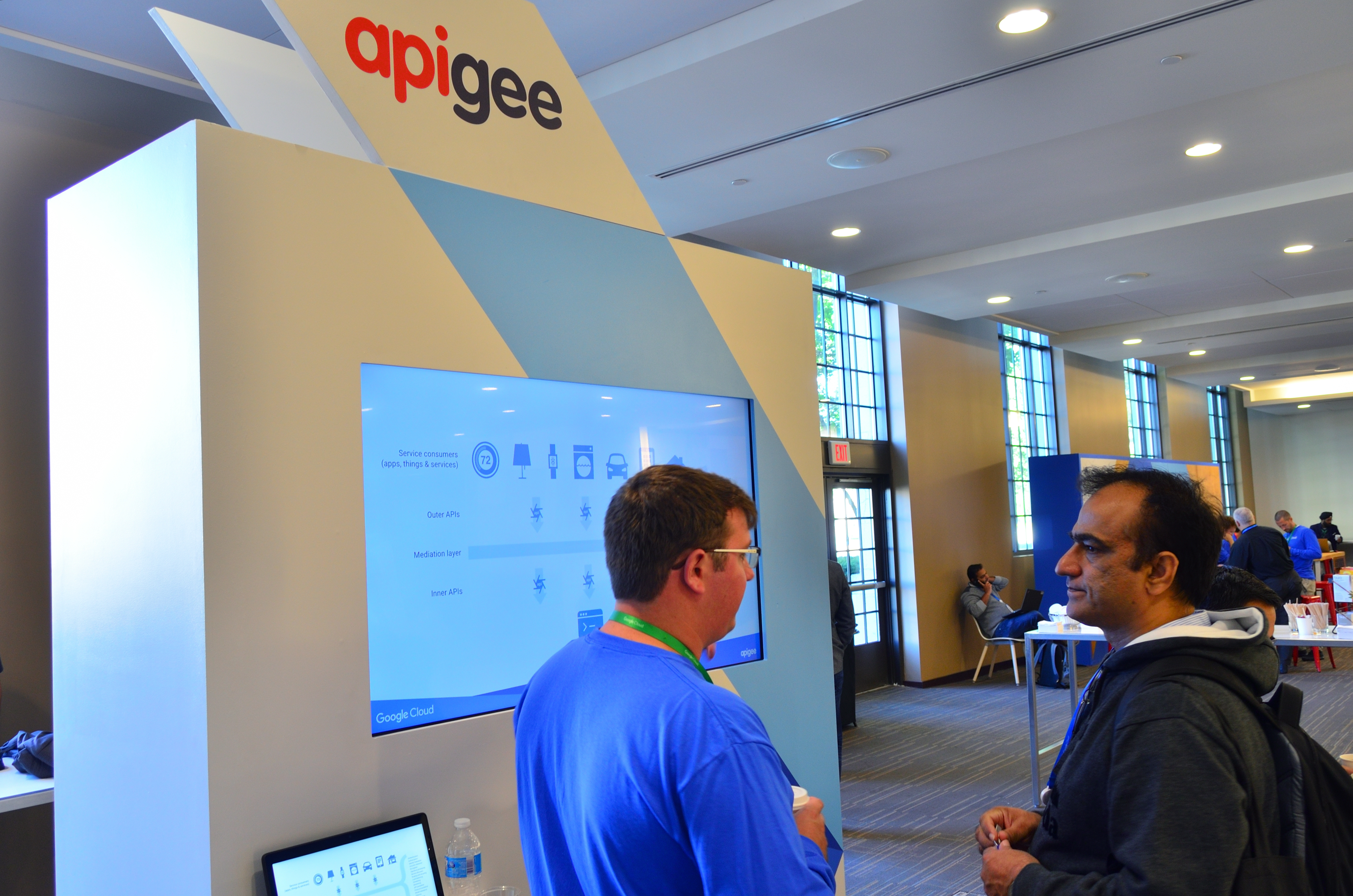
Apigee at Google Cloud conference

Apigee Corp. was an API management and predictive analytics software provider before its merger into Google Cloud. It was founded in 2004 as Sonoa Systems before being rebranded as Apigee in 2010. Apigee was acquired by Google in a deal worth $625 million in 2016.

== History ==
Sonoa Systems was founded in 2004 in Santa Clara, California, by Raj Singh and Ravi Chandra. In early 2006, Sonoa brought on Chet Kapoor as CEO. Initially the company developed a router-like appliance for XML / SOA governance, but over time branched into application platforms and cloud computing. In 2009, Sonoa released a public beta of an API management tool called Apigee, providing app developers with a free, cloud-based platform for providing security and analytics for their APIs. In 2010, Sonoa rebranded as Apigee, and the API Management platform became the core of the business, with premium features added shortly after.

Apigee quickly expanded its corporate customer base, including the likes of Netflix and Walgreens. In 2012, Apigee acquired Mobile API company Usergrid and in 2014, it acquired predictive analytics company InsightsOne. On April 24, 2015, Apigee raised $87 million through an IPO on the NASDAQ.

In 2015, Apigee became a founding member (along with SmartBear and IBM) of the OpenAPI initiative, under the sponsorship of the Linux Foundation.

On September 8, 2016, Google announced it would purchase Apigee for $625 million, and the deal was completed in November 2016.

== Products ==
Apigee revenues are generated through subscriptions to its API management platform and through professional services to subscribing customers. Apigee offers free tiers of its products, with premium features reserved for subscribers.

Apigee also sells additional functionality to subscribing customers, including the ability to monetize APIs, PCI-DSS compliance, multi-region deployment in Amazon Web Services and traffic isolation.
