= Pet Circle =

Australian online retailer of pet supplies

- Formerly: Paws for Life
- Type: Privately held company
- Industry: Pet care
- Founded: 2011 in Sydney, Australia
- Founder: Mike Frizell; James Edwards
- Headquarters: Sydney CBD, New South Wales, Australia
- Area served: Australia
- Website: petcircle.com.au

Pet Circle is an Australian online pet supplies company based in Sydney CBD, New South Wales, Australia, founded by Mike Frizell and James Edwards in 2011.

== History ==
Pet Circle was founded as Paws for Life by Mike Frizell and James Edwards in mid-2011. In early 2014, the company rebranded into the current name.

After a $3 million capital fund raising in 2014, the company tripled its warehouse operations and expanded its product range. Between 2013 and 2015, the company grew by over 300 per cent.

In December 2021, Pet Circle raised $125 million in Series C funding with a valuation of over $1 billion.

In May 2023, Pet Circle added pet insurance to its services. The company secured a $75 million investment in July 2023 to fund its expansion.

== Awards ==
In November 2014, the company was featured on Deloitte's list of fastest-growing technology companies. In 2015 the company's founder, Mike Frizell was nominated as a finalist in the Ernst and Young's Entrepreneur of the Year Awards.
