= Bhoomi =

Bhoomi may refer to:

- Bhūmi, Hindu goddess
- Bhoomi (band), a band in Kolkata, India
- Bhoomi (2000 film), a Kannada-language film
- Bhoomi (2017 film), a Hindi-language film
- Bhoomi (2021 film), a Tamil-language film
- Boomi (software), a land records automation solution
- Bhoomi, an Indian environmental television series aired on Doordarshan

== See also ==
- Bhumi (disambiguation)
- Bumi (disambiguation)
- Janmabhoomi (disambiguation)
