= Boomi, LP =

American software company

Boomi
- Boomi logo, used since 2010
- Type: Private
- Industry: Software
- Founded: 2000; 26 years ago in Berwyn, Pennsylvania, U.S.
- Founders: Rick Nucci
- Headquarters: Conshohocken, Pennsylvania, United States
- Key people: Steve Lucas (CEO); Valerie Rainey (COO); Greg Wolfe (CCO)
- Products: Integration platform as a service (iPaaS); Data integration; Master data management; API Management; Data preparation
- Owner: Francisco Partners; TPG Capital
- Number of employees: 1,907 (2022)
- Website: boomi.com

Boomi is a software company that specializes in integration platform as a service (iPaaS), data integration, API management, master data management, data preparation, and AI-powered automation. The company's platform enables organizations to connect applications, manage APIs, integrate data, and automate business processes through a unified cloud-native solution. Boomi was founded in Berwyn, Pennsylvania, and first launched its services in 2007. The company is currently owned by Francisco Partners and TPG Capital, following their acquisition of Boomi from Dell Technologies in 2021 for $4 billion.

== History ==
Boomi was founded in 2000, beginning with "configuration-based" integration. Its technology allows users to build and deploy integration processes using a visual interface and a drag and drop technique. This interface remains one of the key elements of the current Boomi platform. The company was named after Bhūmi, the Hindu goddess representing Mother Earth.

In 2007, Boomi released the technology now known as "AtomSphere," an Integration Cloud. AtomSphere kept the visual, point and click interface for building integrations and can be managed through a browser-based UI.

In February 2020, Boomi released its Integration Center of Excellence (ICoE) service.

In December 2022, Steve Lucas was appointed as Chairman and Chief Executive Officer.

== M&A ==
- On November 2, 2010, Boomi announced its acquisition by Dell.
- In March 2017, Boomi acquired cloud-development platform company ManyWho.
- In December 2019, Boomi acquired Unifi Software.
- On May 2, 2021, it was announced that Francisco Partners and TPG Capital had entered into a definitive agreement with Dell Technologies to acquire Boomi.
- In May 2024, Boomi acquired the federated API management business from German company APIIDA AG, bringing API Control Plane capabilities for managing APIs across multiple gateway vendors.
- In May 2024, Boomi acquired API management assets from Cloud Software Group, including the Mashery product originally developed by a startup acquired by Intel in 2013 and later by TIBCO Software in 2015.
- In December 2024, Boomi announced a definitive agreement to acquire Rivery, a modern data integration provider specializing in Change Data Capture (CDC) and ELT capabilities.
- In May 2025, Boomi announced a definitive agreement to acquire Thru, Inc., a provider of enterprise-grade Managed File Transfer (MFT) solutions, expected to close by the end of June 2025.

== Platform ==
Boomi provides an integration platform as a service (iPaaS) that connects applications, data sources, and systems through a low-code development platform. The Boomi Enterprise Platform combines integration, API, data management, and automation capabilities to enable organizations to connect disparate systems and automate business processes.

The platform's integration capabilities support event-driven architectures and lifecycle management. Boomi's event-driven architecture partners include Dell EMC and Solace, with integrations for Amazon SQS, Microsoft Azure Service Bus, and RabbitMQ.

Following acquisitions in 2024, the platform expanded its API management functionality to include federated API management through the Boomi API Control Plane, which manages APIs across multiple gateway vendors, alongside an API Gateway and API Developer Portal.

For data management, the platform incorporates data discovery, cataloging, and preparation tools from the Unifi Software acquisition, along with master data management through Boomi DataHub. The 2024 acquisition of Rivery added Change Data Capture (CDC) and ELT capabilities for real-time data movement between databases, data warehouses, and cloud applications. The 2025 acquisition of Thru added Managed File Transfer (MFT) for secure file exchange in regulated industries.

In 2024, Boomi introduced Agentstudio, a framework for building and deploying AI agents that automate integration, data management, and workflow tasks. The platform's unified approach enables customers to manage application integration, API governance, data pipelines, file transfers, and AI-powered automation from a single interface.

In August 2019, Boomi's iPaaS was authorized by FedRAMP.

== See also ==
- Integration platform as a service
- API management
- Low-code development platform
- Enterprise application integration
- Extract, transform, load
- Change data capture
- Master data management
- Managed file transfer
- Event-driven architecture
- AI agent
- Business process automation
