= Multi-currency pricing =

Pricing using a variety of foreign currencies

Multi-currency pricing (MCP) is a method that international companies use to do business using local currencies. This allows them to price goods and services in a variety of foreign currencies, while continuing to receive settlement and reporting in their home currency. With MCP, merchants can sell the same item to British customers in pounds sterling, French and German customers in euros, and Japanese customers in yen. A sales tool that helps merchants expand into other sectors of the global marketplace, MCP allows cardholders to shop, view prices and pay in the currency of their choice.

For example, a Japanese consumer browsing a US-based website with MCP functionality may view prices in US dollars or in Japanese yen. The consumer is then given the option to pay in the currency of his or her choice. If the customer chooses to pay in Yen, this service guarantees that this exact Japanese yen amount will be debited to the cardholder account, and the exact US dollar amount will be credited to the merchant's account. The cardholder is not charged any additional fees for this service.

Among the biggest advantages to merchants according to proponents:

- Ability to localize websites and expand to other regions
- Cater to international customers by pricing in a currency they understand and feel more comfortable with, while continuing to receive settlement and reporting in one currency
- Reduces customer service inquiries and chargebacks

The MCP solution is mostly found in card not present (internet, mail-order/telephone-order) environments, but can also be used as a terminal application in card present (POS) environments.
