= Bhumi (organisation) =

Indian non-profit organisation

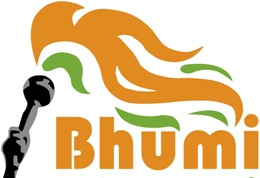
- Founded: 2006
- Founder: Ayyanar Elumalai; Harisankar Namasivayam; Prahalathan KK
- Type: Volunteering
- Purpose: Civic engagement, education, environment, social entrepreneurship
- Location: India
- Website: www.bhumi.ngo

Bhumi is an Indian volunteering non-profit organisation. Established in 2006 in Chennai, it is involved in various activities associated with education, environment, and civic engagement. As of 2020, it had over 30,000 volunteers in more than 12 cities across India.

== History ==
In 2006, a group of students and young professionals joined together to volunteer to teach children at an orphanage in Chennai. Bhumi was established in Chennai on 15 August 2006 by a group of students and young professionals led by Ayyanar Elumalai, Harishankar Namasivayam, and Prahalathan KK. It expanded to Tiruchchirappalli in 2009, and had a volunteer strength of over 500 by 2015. By 2016, the organisation was active in 12 cities across India and was working with over 15,000 children. As of 2020, it had over 30,000 volunteers across India.

== Programmes ==
The volunteers are primarily college students and young professionals, working voluntarily. It is involved in various activities associated with education, environment, and civic engagement, with primary focus on education of children. The organisation designs its own academic and non-academic programmes, which run in parallel to the school curriculum, for children living in orphanages and are tutored by its volunteers in community centers. It also conducts hands on training, and leadership programmes, to prepare the children to take up higher education and become financially independent later. It organises a two-day annual talent identification programme called Nakshatra to identify talents in art, science, and sport. The identified children undergo specialised development programme to hone their skills.

The Catalyze programme encompasses Bhumi's civic projects that engage volunteers in causes like animal welfare, community welfare, and environmental causes. During the Covid-19 induced lockdown in 2020, the organisation conducted an online dance competition aimed at identifying and nurturing such potential in lesser-privileged children. Bhumi also supports Corporate social responsibility initiatives of various companies.

== Awards ==
Bhumi was the winner of the "Leader in Volunteer Engagement Award 2013" at the iVolunteer Awards. It was recipient of the "Award for excellence in the field of education" (2013) from the Rotary Club.
