= ProgrammableWeb =

ProgrammableWeb was an information and news source about the Web as a programmable platform. It was a subsidiary of MuleSoft with offices in San Francisco, CA. The website published a repository documenting over 19,000 open APIs along with mashups and thousands of applications. It was referred to as the "journal of the API economy" by TechCrunch. The site was shut down, after 17 years of operation, in 2023.

== History ==
ProgrammableWeb was founded in 2005 by John Musser and had documented 1,000 APIs by November 2008.

In June 2010, Alcatel-Lucent acquired ProgrammableWeb as part of a move by the company to align themselves closer to the developer community. Alcatel-Lucent was looking to integrate ProgrammableWeb’s API monitoring services and other API related technologies with its own Open API Service and Developer Platform to strengthen its relationship with developers. During ProgrammableWeb’s time with Alcatel-Lucent, they documented over 8,000 APIs.

Three years later on April 13, 2013, MuleSoft announced the acquisition of ProgrammableWeb to "become the go-to destination for APIs and Integration”.

On February 3, 2023, Mulesoft announced that it had shut down Programmable Web after 17 years of operation.
