= MuleSoft =

American software company

MuleSoft, LLC.
- Formerly: Azechi, Inc.; (April 2006 – July 2006); MuleSource, LLC.; (July 2006 – August 2009)
- Type: Subsidiary
- Industry: Computer software; SaaS; Open-source software
- Founded: 2007; 19 years ago
- Founders: Ross Mason; Dave Rosenberg
- Successor: Salesforce
- Headquarters: San Francisco, California, U.S.
- Key people: Brent Hayward; (CEO)
- Products: Anypoint Platform; Mule runtime engine
- Revenue: ▲US$ 296.46 million (2017)
- Operating income: ▼US$ -79.80 million (2017)
- Net income: ▼US$ -79.98 million (2017)
- Total assets: ▲US$ 492.60 million (2017)
- Total equity: ▲US$ 232.95 million (2017)
- Number of employees: 1,188 (2017)
- Parent: Salesforce
- Website: mulesoft.com

MuleSoft, LLC. is an American software company headquartered in San Francisco that provides a unified platform for integration, API management, and managing multi-agent systems.

In 2018, Mulesoft was acquired by Salesforce for $6.5 billion in a cash-and-stock deal.

== History ==
MuleSource, as the company was originally called, was founded by Ross Mason and Dave Rosenberg in 2006. The company was built around the successful Open Source Software (OSS) project, Mule, which Ross Mason founded in 2003. The "mule" in the name comes from the drudgery, or "donkey work", of data and application integration that the platform was created to escape.The company changed its name to MuleSoft in 2009.

MuleSoft originally provided middleware and messaging, and later expanded to provide an integration platform as a service (iPaaS) approach for companies through its main product, Anypoint Platform.

In April 2013, the company announced $37 million in Series E financing in a round led by New Enterprise Associates, with participation from new strategic investor Salesforce.com, and existing investors Hummer Winblad Venture Partners, Morgenthaler Ventures, Lightspeed Venture Partners, Meritech Capital Partners, Sapphire Ventures (formerly SAP Ventures) and Bay Partners. This brought MuleSoft's total financing, over the course of seven rounds, to $259 million.

In April 2013, MuleSoft acquired ProgrammableWeb, a website used by developers to help build web, mobile and other connected applications through APIs.

In February 2017, the company filed for an IPO, and began trading on the New York Stock Exchange on March 17, 2017.

In May 2018, Salesforce.com bought MuleSoft in a deal reported to be worth $6.5 billion.

== Products ==
MuleSoft's Anypoint Platform includes Anypoint Design Center, which allows API developers to design and build APIs; Anypoint Exchange, a library for API providers to share APIs, templates, and assets; and Anypoint Management Center, a centralized web interface to analyze, manage, and monitor APIs and integrations. MuleSoft also offers the Mule runtime engine for connecting enterprise applications on-premises and to the cloud, designed to eliminate the need for custom point-to-point integration code.

== Operations ==
As of August 2019, MuleSoft had more than 1,400 employees and more than 1,600 customers.
