= Wordnik =

Online English language resource that provides dictionary and thesaurus content

Wordnik.com
- Website type: Reference (dictionary, thesaurus, etc.)
- Available in: English
- Owners: Wordnik Society, Inc.
- Creator: Wordnik Society Inc.
- Website: www.wordnik.com
- Registration: Optional
- Users: 81,556 (as of 20 January 2012)
- Launched: June 2009; 17 years ago

Wordnik is an online English dictionary, language resource, and nonprofit organization that provides dictionary and thesaurus content. Some of the content is based on print dictionaries such as the Century Dictionary, the American Heritage Dictionary, WordNet, and the GNU Collaborative International Dictionary of English. Wordnik has collected a corpus of billions of words which it uses to display example sentences, allowing it to provide information on a much larger set of words than a typical dictionary. Wordnik uses as many real examples as possible when defining a word.

Wiktionary, the free open dictionary project, is one major source of words and citations used by Wordnik.

== History ==
Wordnik.com was launched as a closed beta in February 2008 and opened to all in June 2009. Cofounders of the site are CEO Erin McKean, editorial director Grant Barrett, and chief computational lexicographer Orion Montoya, and head of engineering Anthony Tam. McKean, Barrett, and Montoya all formerly worked in the US Dictionaries Department of Oxford University Press. The startup company was originally headquartered in San Mateo, California.

In September 2009, Wordnik purchased the social language site Wordie.org from John McGrath, who joined the company as Director of Product. All Wordie.org accounts and data were subsequently transferred to Wordnik.

As of December 2011, Wordnik had raised $12.8 million in venture financing.

Wordnik's material is sourced from the Internet by automatic programs. It then shows readers the information regarding a certain word without any editorial influence. Wordnik does not allow for user-contributed definitions, but seems to assert that it may allow for this in the future.

In January 2011, McKean relaunched the company as Reverb Technologies, Inc. in Palo Alto, with Wordnik co-founder Anthony Tam.

Under the name Reverb, they kept operating Wordnik.com, but also expanded its technology to other services and products, including "Reverb for Publishers" which was a plug-in for blogs to find related articles.

The company began a Kickstarter campaign in 2015 with the purpose of finding and adding a million words to Wordnik that had not yet been included in major English dictionaries.

== Statistics ==
As of 14 January 2012, Wordnik Zeitgeist reports that,

Wordnik is billions of words, 971,860,842 example sentences, 6,925,967 unique words, 231,628 comments, 178,718 tags, 121,432 pronunciations, 77,736 favorites and 1,022,649 words in 32,703 lists created by 81,138 Wordniks.

— Wordnik Zeitgeist
