= Cloud-based integration =

Systems integration delivered as a cloud computing service

Cloud-based integration is a form of systems integration business delivered as a cloud computing service that addresses data, process, service-oriented architecture (SOA) and application integration.

== Description ==
Integration platform as a service (iPaaS) is a suite of cloud services enabling customers to develop, execute and govern integration flows between disparate applications. Under the cloud-based iPaaS integration model, customers drive the development and deployment of integrations without installing or managing any hardware or middleware. The iPaaS model allows businesses to achieve integration without big investment into skills or licensed middleware software. iPaaS used to be regarded primarily as an integration tool for cloud-based software applications, used mainly by small to mid-sized business. Over time, a hybrid type of iPaaS—hybrid-IT iPaaS—that connects cloud to on-premises, is becoming increasingly popular. Additionally, large enterprises are exploring new ways of integrating iPaaS into their existing IT infrastructures.

Cloud integration was created to break down the data silos, improve connectivity and optimize the business process. Cloud integration has increased in popularity as the usage of Software as a Service solutions has grown.

Prior to the emergence of cloud computing in the early 2000s, integration could be categorized as either internal or business to business (B2B). Internal integration requirements were serviced through an on-premises middleware platform and typically utilized a service bus to manage exchange of data between systems. B2B integration was serviced through EDI gateways or value-added network (VAN). The advent of SaaS applications created a new kind of demand which was met through cloud-based integration. Since their emergence, many such services have also developed the capability to integrate legacy or on-premises applications, as well as function as EDI gateways.

The following essential features were proposed by one marketing company:

- Deployed on a multi-tenant, elastic cloud infrastructure
- Subscription model pricing (operating expense, not capital expenditure)
- No software development (required connectors should already be available)
- Users do not perform deployment or manage the platform itself
- Presence of integration management and monitoring features

The emergence of this sector led to new cloud-based business process management tools that do not need to build integration layers - since those are now a separate service.

Drivers of growth include the need to integrate mobile app capabilities with proliferating API publishing resources and the growth in demand for the Internet of things functionalities as more 'things' connect to the Internet.

== See also ==
- Platform as a service
- as a service
