= Forrester Research =

Research and advisory company

Forrester Research, Inc.
- Type: Public
- Traded as: Nasdaq: FORR
- Industry: Market research Information technology
- Founded: July 1983; 43 years ago
- Founder: George F. Colony
- Headquarters: 60 Acorn Park Drive, Cambridge, Massachusetts, U.S.
- Revenue: ▼US$397 million (2025)
- Net income: ▼ −US$119 million (2025)
- Number of employees: 1,700+
- Website: forrester.com

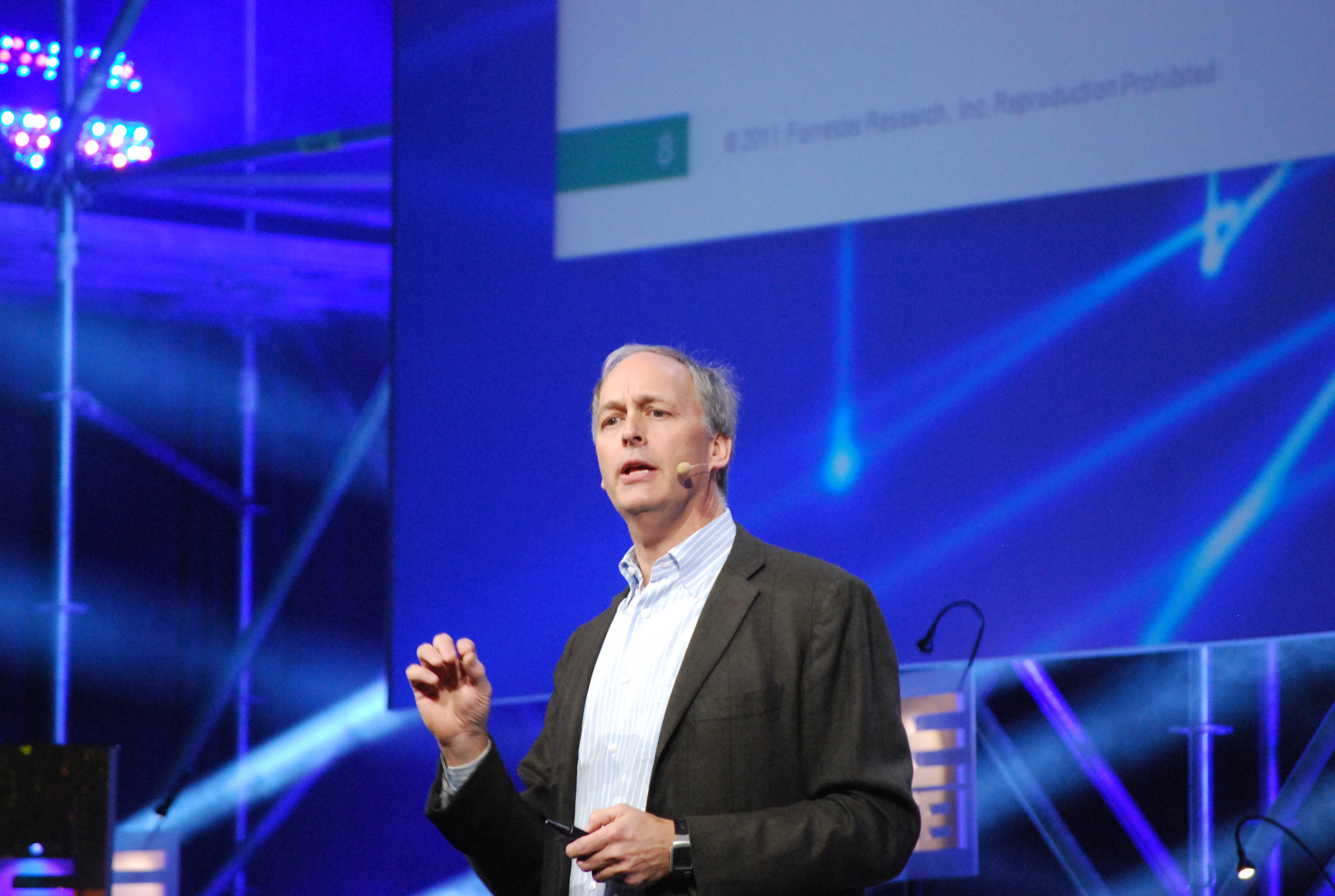
George Colony, CEO of Forrester Research

Forrester Research, Inc. is a research and advisory firm working in research, consulting and events. Forrester’s clients include large global business, technology and consumer enterprises. The firm is headquartered in Cambridge, MA.

== History ==
Forrester was founded in July 1983 by George Forrester Colony in Cambridge, MA. In November 1996, Forrester announced its initial public offering on the Nasdaq Stock Market. The offering raised approximately $32 million through the sale of 2.3 million shares, providing capital for geographic and service expansion.

In November 1999, the company acquired Fletcher Research, a London-based internet research firm. In October 2000, it acquired FORIT GmbH, a technology research provider based in Frankfurt, Germany, further extending its presence in Europe.

Forrester launched its Wave reports in July 2002 as a new methodology for evaluating technology vendors.

=== Acquisitions ===
In March 2003, Forrester acquired Giga Information Group for $62 million in cash.

In July 2008, Forrester acquired JupiterResearch, a New York-based firm specializing in digital media, marketing, and consumer behavior analysis. In December 2009, it also acquired Strategic Oxygen, a firm providing marketing planning tools and analytics to global IT vendors.

Forrester acquired Springboard Research, a Singapore-based firm focused on emerging Asian technology markets, in May 2011.

In January 2019, Forrester acquired SiriusDecisions, a B2B research and advisory firm, for approximately $245 million.

In May 2021, Forrester launched their Forrester Decisions portfolio.

== Leadership ==
- George F. Colony, chairman of the board and CEO
