= DLT =

DLT may refer to:

== Businesses ==
- DLT (department store), Saint Petersburg, Russia
- DLT Solutions, a software reseller in Virginia, US

== Music ==
- DLT (musician), New Zealand hip-hop DJ
- Dave Lee Travis (born 1945), British radio DJ
- De La Tierra, an international Latin American metal band

== Science, technology and mathematics ==
- Digital Linear Tape, a computer storage magnetic tape format
- Direct linear transformation, an algorithm to solve systems of equations in projective geometry
- Distributed Language Translation, a now defunct software project using Esperanto as an intermediate language, which ran between 1985 and 1990
- Distributed ledger technology, a system for holding replicated, shared, and synchronized digital data spread across multiple sites, in blockchains
- Dose limiting toxicity (or dose-limiting toxicity), in drug development; e.g. see Hydroxycarbamide
- Dowel Laminated Timber, a type of engineered lumber
- International Conference on Developments in Language Theory, a computer science conference
- Dead letter topic, a service implementation to store messages that the messaging system cannot or should not deliver

== Other uses ==
- Boels–Dolmans Cycling Team (Union Cycliste Internationale abbreviation)
- Donald L. Taffner (1930-2011), American television producer
- Displaced left turn, another name for a continuous-flow intersection
