= Dulles Technology Corridor =

Business cluster of defense and technology companies

Coordinates: 38°56′43″N 77°19′50.7″W

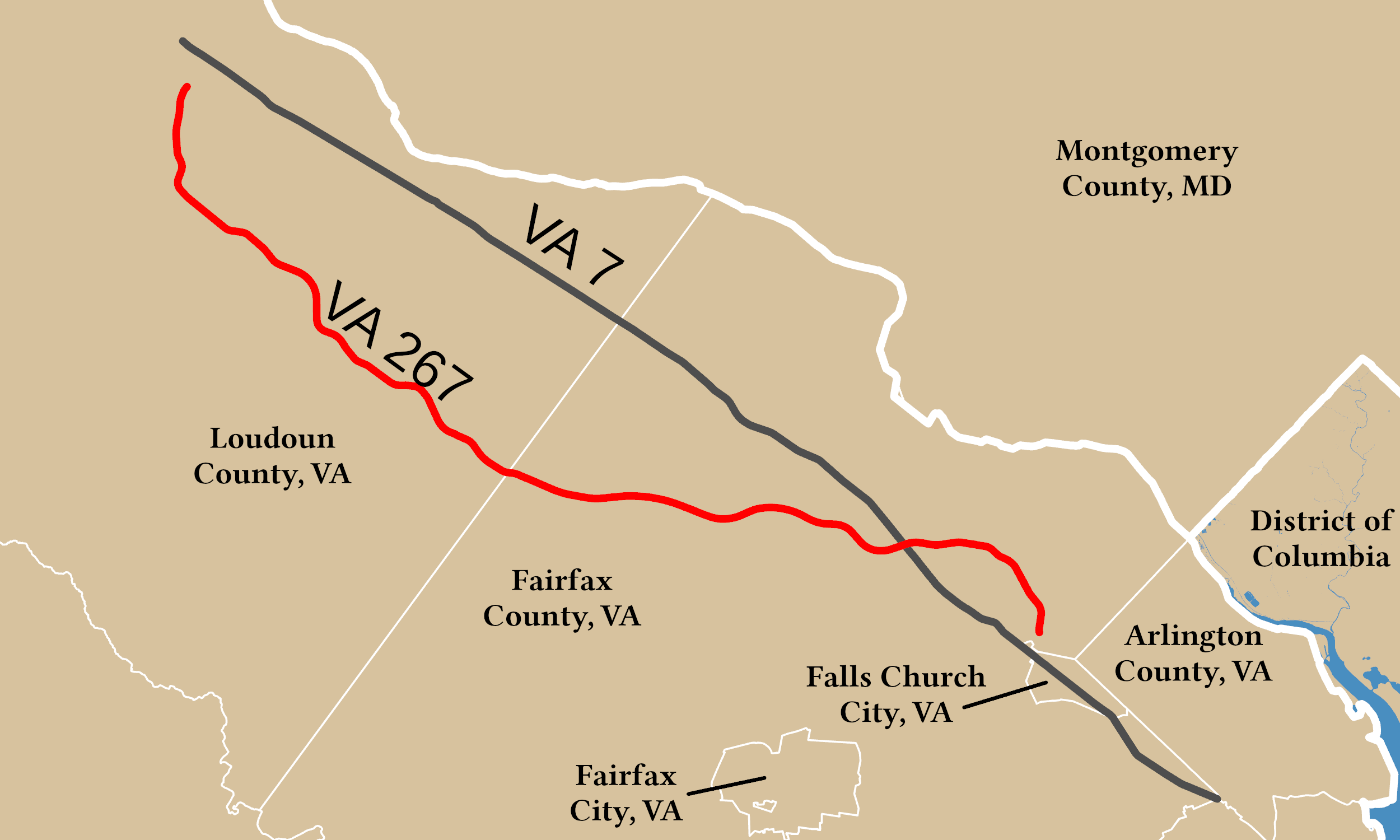
The two roads that anchor the Dulles Technology Corridor

The Dulles Technology Corridor is a business cluster containing many defense and technology companies, located in Northern Virginia near Washington Dulles International Airport. The area was called "The Silicon Valley of the East" by Atlantic magazine. It was dubbed the Netplex in a 1993 article by Fortune magazine. Another article in 2000 claimed that the area contained "vital electronic pathways that carry more than half of all traffic on the Internet. The region is home to more telecom and satellite companies than any other place on earth."

The Dulles Technology Corridor is a descriptive term for a string of communities that lie along and between Virginia State Route 267 (the Dulles Toll Road and Dulles Greenway), and Virginia State Route 7 (Leesburg Pike and Harry Byrd Highway). It especially includes the communities, from east to west, of Tysons Corner, Reston, Herndon, Sterling, and Ashburn. These communities are in Fairfax and Loudoun counties, which are the second-highest and highest income counties in the U.S. as of 2011, coinciding with the national technology and local internet boom of the 1990s and local technology spending after the September 11, 2001 attacks.

== Internet infrastructure and data centers ==
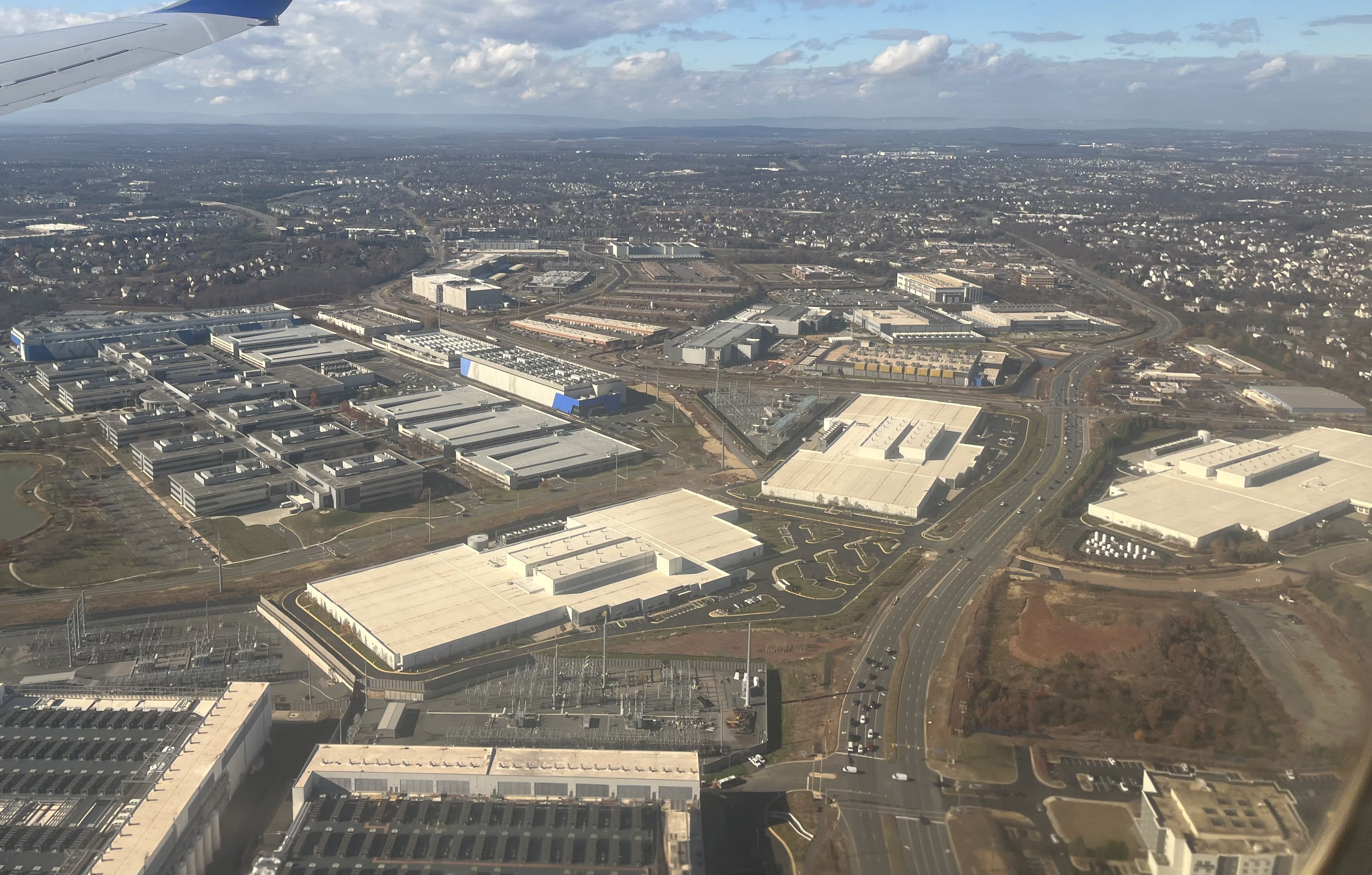
An aerial view of data centers intermingled with other commercial buildings in Loudoun County, near Ashburn

As of 2009, more than 50% of all U.S. Internet traffic travelled through Northern Virginia. In his book Tubes, author Andrew Blum calls Ashburn, Virginia—a community within the Dulles Technology Corridor—"the bullseye of America's Internet." The Dulles Technology Corridor serves as headquarters for domain name registrar Network Solutions and network infrastructure company Verisign. The region contains the Internet Society, and used to contain the mainframe that houses the master list of all Internet domain names.

The Dulles Technology Corridor includes Ashburn, Virginia's Data Center Alley, described by the Washington Business Journal as "an area that is quickly emerging as a national hub for data storage facilities." The corridor also has data centers in Sterling, Herndon, Reston, and Tysons Corner. The area is a growing home for major data centers including those of Amazon Web Services (AWS)'s US East region, where an estimated 70% of AWS IP addresses are housed. Wikimedia Foundation has its primary data center in the corridor. According to U.S. News & World Report, "Northern Virginia remains popular, in part because it has some of the country's cheapest electricity rates." According to Data Center Map, Northern Virginia is home to more than 300 data centers.

== Business environment ==
The Dulles Technology Corridor has access to a highly educated workforce. Of adults aged 25 and over, 58.2% in Fairfax County and 57.6% in Loudoun County have a bachelor's degree or higher, compared with 28.2% for the U.S. as a whole.

The George Washington University's Virginia Science and Technology Campus and the Howard Hughes Medical Institute's Janelia Farm Research Campus are located in the corridor.

=== Company headquarters ===
The following companies are headquartered in the Dulles Technology Corridor:

- Aerovironment
- Amazon (Amazon has two headquarters, the other being in Seattle, WA)
- Alarm.com
- Appian Corporation
- Boeing
- Booz Allen Hamilton
- CACI
- Capital One
- Carahsoft
- DXC Technology
- DLT Solutions
- DynCorp
- ePlus
- General Dynamics
- GeoEye
- Freddie Mac
- ICF International
- ID.me
- Iridium Communications
- ITT Exelis
- Leidos
- Mandiant
- ManTech
- MicroStrategy
- Mitre Corporation
- Network Solutions
- NeuStar
- Northrop Grumman
- Orbital ATK
- Peraton
- Raytheon
- Rolls-Royce
- SAIC
- The Sovereign Group
- VeriSign
- Volkswagen
- X-Mode social
- XO Communications

=== Regional offices ===
The following companies have major regional offices located in the Dulles Technology Corridor:

- Accenture
- Adobe Systems
- AgustaWestland
- Amazon Web Services
- Amdocs
- Airbus
- Oath (AOL/Yahoo!)
- Apple
- AT&T
- BAE Systems
- Broadcom
- Capgemini
- CDW
- Charter Communications
- Cisco Systems
- Cox Communications
- Dell
- Deloitte
- EMC Corporation
- Equinix
- ESRI
- ExxonMobil
- Fairchild Dornier
- FireEye
- Google
- Harris Corporation
- Hewlett-Packard
- Hewlett Packard Enterprise
- Juniper Networks
- IBM
- L-3 Communications
- Lockheed Martin
- Microsoft
- NEC
- NetApp
- Nissan Motors
- Nutanix
- Oracle Corporation
- Palo Alto Networks
- Perot Systems
- Red Hat
- Rockwell Collins
- Rolls-Royce North America
- Salesforce.com
- SAP
- ServiceNow
- Siemens
- Sprint Nextel
- Symantec
- Tata Communications
- Terremark
- Time Warner Cable
- Unisys
- Visa Inc.
- Verizon
- VMware

== See also ==
- MAE-East
