= List of shopping malls in Saint Petersburg =

This is a list of shopping malls in Saint Petersburg, Russia

== Malls in Saint Petersburg ==
As of December 2017, Saint Petersburg had 139 malls.

Malls in Saint Petersburg
Name	Opened	Mall website	Owner	Number of stores	Size (Leasable area), square metres
Akademicheskij	2002	Akademicheskij website	Adamant holding company	188	65,000
Atlantic City	2009	Atlantic City website	Ilan management company	81	73,870
Atmosfera	2008	Atmosfera website	Adamant holding company	71	47,720 (21,500)
Au Pont Rouge	2014	Au Pont Rouge website	APR Retail Group, LLC	>121	39,000
Outlet Village Pulkovo	2015	Outlet Village Pulkovo website	Hines International Inc	95	30,000 (15,000)
Balkanija NOVA	2006	Balkanija NOVA website	Adamant holding company	109	93,000
Balkansky	1996	Balkansky website	Adamant holding company	171	85,000
Great Gostiny Dvor	1785	Bolshoj Gostinyj Dvor website	Bolshoj Gostinyj Dvor, PLC (since 1994)	>72	78,000
City Mall	2007	City Mall website	Fortgroup investment company	131	100,676 (68,511)
DLT	1836	DLT website	European Capital Investment Fund	>254	32,000
Europolis	2014	Europolis website	Fortgroup investment company	160	141,700 (60,000)
Frantsuzskij bulvar	2005	Frantsuzskij bulvar website	Fortgroup investment company	74	16,416 (11,260)
Galeria	2010	Galeria website	Morgan Stanley Real Estate Fund VII	270	192,000 (96,000)
Grand Canyon	2006	Grand Canyon website	Solomon, PLC	181	150,000 (53,000)
Grand Palace	2003	Grand Palace website		76	20,000 (5,000)
Gulliver	2004	Gulliver website		100	86,000 (62,394)
June		June website	Regiony Group of Companies	88	62,000 (30,500)
Kontinent on Bajkonurskaja	2007	Kontinent website	Adamant holding company	55	44,000
Kontinent on Buharestskaja	2012	Kontinent website	Adamant holding company	54	86,300 (85,000)
Kontinent on Stachek	2006	Kontinent website	Adamant holding company	112	69,300
Kontinent on Zvezdnaja	2009	Kontinent website	Adamant holding company	116	40,000 (21,250)
Kosmos on Tipanova	2012	Kosmos website		55	54,000 (27,000)
Leto	2011	Leto website	Colliers International	138	116,000 (76,000)
Ligov	2011	Ligov website	Adamant holding company	44	34,400
London Mall	2013	London Mall website	Fortgroup investment company	96	83,000 (61,300)
Mega Dybenko	2006	Mega website	IKEA International Group	180	145,000
Mega Parnas	2006	Mega website	IKEA International Group	152	127,000
Mercury	2003	Mercury website	Adamant holding company	73	97,130 (77,000)
Mezhdunarodnyj	2012	Mezhdunarodnyj website	Adamant holding company	40	46,400
Modnyj promenad	2007	Modnyj promenad website		102	22,000 (13,150)
Miller Center		Miller Center website		>12	
Nevskij		Nevskij website		>28	
Nevskij Atrium				>13	
Nevsky Centre		Nevsky Centre website		>54	
Nord		Nord website		>24	
Passage	1848	Passage website		>21	
