= BUW =

buw or BUW may refer to:

- buw Holding (German company)
- Warsaw University Library (Biblioteka Uniwersytecka w Warszawie)
- BUW, the IATA code for Baubau Airport, Indonesia
- Boat Under Weight - used in the sport of rowing
- University of Wuppertal (Bergische Universität Wuppertal), Germany
