= Dulles Corridor =

Dulles Corrdidor may refer to:

- Dulles Technology Corridor
- Dulles Corridor Metrorail Project
- Dulles Corridor Users Group
- Dulles Toll Road
