= DLT Solutions =

DLT Solutions, LLC
- Type: Limited Liability Company
- Founded: 1991
- Founder: Thomas J. Marrelli
- Headquarters: Herndon, Virginia, USA
- Key people: Art Richer, CEO Joe Donohue, CFO Brian Strosser, President
- Number of employees: 230 (2023)
- Website: https://www.dlt.com/

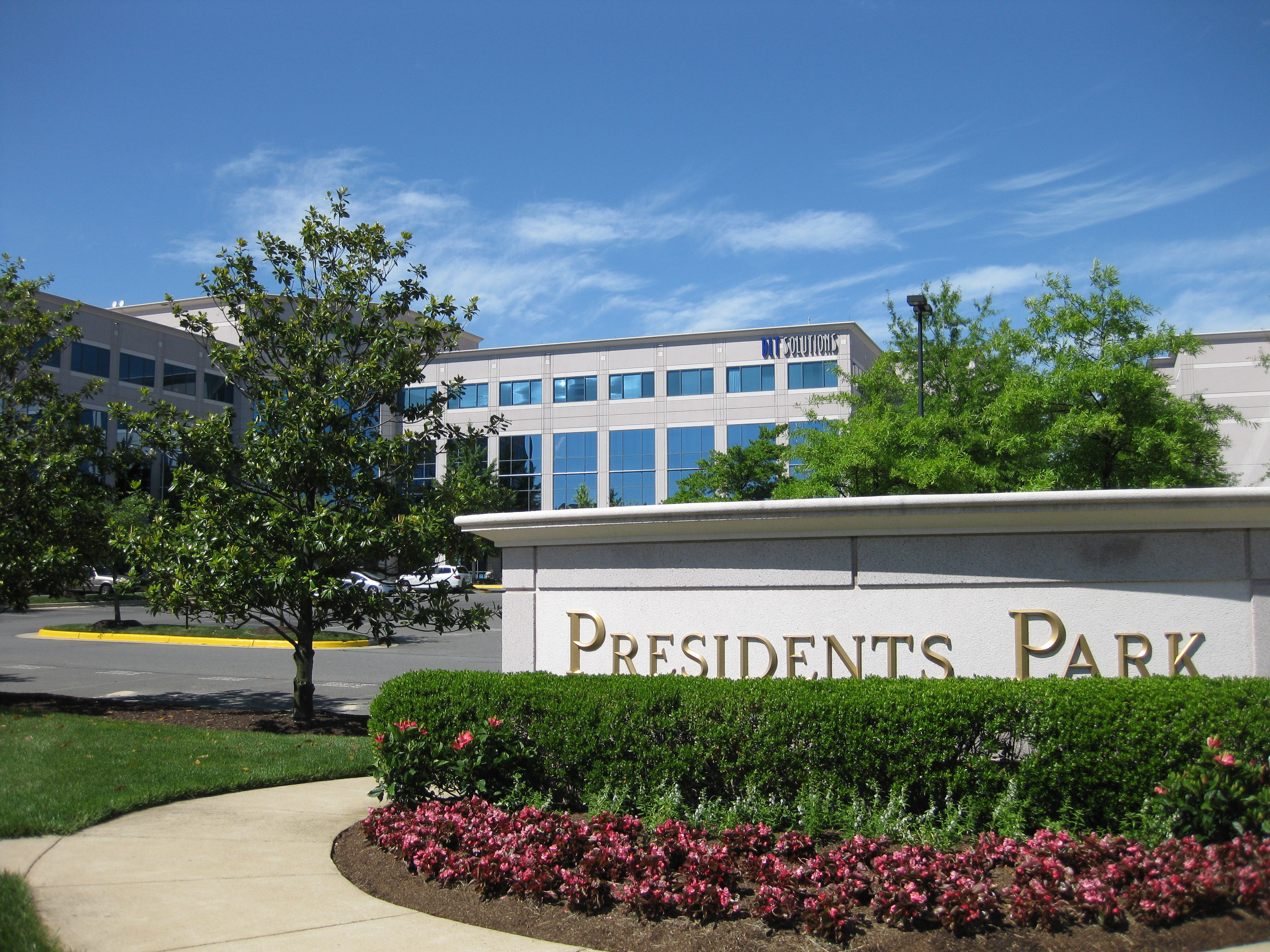
Office of DLT Solutions in Herndon, Virginia, in 2010

DLT Solutions is an American company in Herndon, Virginia. It is a value-added reseller of software and hardware and a professional services provider to the federal, state, and local governments as well as educational institutions.

DLT Solutions was founded in 1991 by Thomas Marrelli, who died in 2002. In 2005, his heirs sold DLT Solutions to then-DLT president and chief executive officer Rick Marcotte and then-Chief Financial Officer Craig Adler. DLT Solutions had revenue of roughly $800 million in 2012, $857 million in 2013, and over $900 million in 2014. In 2015, DLT was sold by majority owner MTZP Capital Group to private equity firm Millstein & Co. In 2015, the company had 230 employees in the Washington metropolitan area. Tech Data acquired DLT in 2019 for $205 million. Tech Data was acquired by Apollo Global Management in 2020 and later merged with Synnex to become part of TD Synnex.

The company primarily resells software and hardware from Autodesk, Dell Software, Red Hat, Oracle Corporation, and Symantec. In 2014, it released two products, CODEvolved and Cloud Navigator, to help public-sector employees learn and implement cloud computing products.

== History ==
DLT Solutions was founded in 1991 by Thomas J. Marrelli. DLT Solutions is a value-added reseller of software and hardware and professional services provider in Herndon, Virginia. In July 2004, Rick Marcotte was appointed DLT's president and CEO after having been on its board of directors for a year. After Marrelli died in 2002, his heirs in 2005 sold the company to DLT president and chief executive officer Rick Marcotte and Chief Financial Officer Craig Adler. During the acquisition, SunTrust Banks handled the financing, while BB&T Capital Markets and Windsor Group advised DLT Solutions. Marcotte had worked with the founder, Thomas Marrelli, in the mid-1990s when Marrelli led Exide Electronics' federal systems branch and Marcotte was the new business development director. In 2005, the company resold products from Oracle Corporation, Autodesk, Quest Solutions, Red Hat and Adobe Systems.

The company mostly works with groups in the public sector such as the United States Department of Defense and local and state administrations. In 2013, after federal spending shrunk, DLT's work with local and state governments increased more than with the federal government. DLT scored a contract with Colorado to install Oracle software for its health insurance marketplace. In 2014, DLT's main vendors were Autodesk, Dell Software, Red Hat, Oracle Corporation, and Symantec, which DLT used for 80% of its enterprises.

=== Millstein & Co. acquisition ===
On January 30, 2015, DLT Solutions announced that private equity firm Millstein & Co. had bought it. Prior to Millstein's purchase, MTZP Capital Group had been the majority owner. In the acquisition agreement, Millstein & Co. operating partner Alan Marc Smith became the president and CEO of DLT Solutions, taking over from Rick Marcotte, who had been DLT Solutions President and CEO for over a decade. After the acquisition, Marcotte became DLT Solutions' board's vice chairman and consultant. In three two years prior to the Milstein acquisition, DLT Solutions had revenue of roughly $800 million in 2012, $857 million in 2013 and over $900 million in 2014.

In the several months before the acquisition, DLT scored multimillion-dollar deals with the Social Security Administration, the United States Department of the Navy, NASA SEWP, the United States Department of Defense, and Internet2. In 2015, the company had 230 employees in the Washington metropolitan area.

=== Tech Data acquisition and TD Synnex ===
In November 2019, Tech Data agreed to acquire DLT Solutions from its private equity owner, Millstein & Co. for $205 million in cash. The deal closed on November 25, 2019, making DLT a wholly owned subsidiary of Tech Data. In 2020, Tech Data was taken private by Apollo Global Management. In September 2021, Tech Data merged with Synnex Corporation to form TD Synnex. In October 2022, TD Synnex launched TD Synnex Public Sector, combining DLT Solutions, Synnex GovSolv, and Tech Data's public sector business into a unified organization focused on government customers.

== Products ==
In April 2014, DLT released CODEvolved, a platform-as-a-service product that integrates Red Hat's OpenShift, Amazon Web Services, and DLT's domain knowledge. The technology is intended to help DLT customers quickly learn cloud computing products. In June 2014, DLT released DLT Cloud Navigator, a basket of tools that helps public sector entities implement cloud technology. Cloud Navigator contains products from Oracle Corporation, Red Hat, and Amazon.com.
