= Computer 2000 =

Provider of IT products

- Industry: Information technology
- Founded: 1983; 42 years ago
- Founder: Axel Schultze
- Defunct: 1998
- Fate: Merged with Tech Data
- Headquarters: Munich, Germany
- Area served: Europe, Latin America, Middle East, Africa
- Operating income: $2.5 million (1984)
- Number of employees: 2,500 (1998)

Computer 2000 was Europe's leading provider of IT products to resellers between 1983 and its merger with Tech Data in 1998.

== History ==
The company was founded in 1983 by German entrepreneur Axel Schultze. The company had $2.5 Million in sales in 1984, and expanded from Germany into other European countries by creating subsidiaries and acquiring local distributors. In the early 1990s, Computer 2000 expanded into Latin America, the Middle East, and Africa. Within 15 years, the company grew to 2,500 employees and roughly $5 Billion in sales before merging with US-based Tech Data in July 1998. The companies had similar philosophies and products, but acted in different geographic regions.

== External links and references ==
- Company website
- Welt Report
- SEC filing
- Merger approval by European Commission
- Polish site of Computer 2000
