= List of largest companies in the United States by revenue =

List of US companies by revenue

The first list includes the largest companies in the United States by revenue as of 2024, according to the Fortune 500 and Forbes rankings. The Fortune 500 list of companies includes only publicly traded companies, also including tax inversion companies. There are also corporations having foundation in the United States, such as corporate headquarters, operational headquarters and independent subsidiaries. However, this list does include several government-sponsored enterprises that were created by acts of Congress and later became publicly traded.

The second list used 2024 data and includes large privately held companies such as Cargill and Koch Industries.

== List of the largest public / publicly traded companies ==
Below are the 100 largest companies by revenue in 2025 (mostly for fiscal year 2024), according to the Fortune 500 list.

The following industries are represented in the top 100 largest companies: Aerospace and defense, agriculture manufacturing, airline, automotive, beverage, conglomerate, energy, financials, food industry and food processing, health insurance, healthcare, information technology, insurance, machinery, media, petroleum, pharmaceutical and pharmacy wholesale, retail, technology, telecommunications, telecom hardware manufacturing, and transportation.

Rank	Name	Industry	Revenue (USD millions)	Revenue growth	Employees	Headquarters
1	Walmart	Retail	680,985	▲5.1%	2,100,000	Bentonville, Arkansas
2	Amazon	Retail and cloud computing	637,959	▲11.0%	1,556,000	Seattle, Washington
3	UnitedHealth Group	Healthcare	400,278	▲7.7%	400,000	Minnetonka, Minnesota
4	Apple	Technology	391,035	▲2.0%	164,000	Cupertino, California
5	CVS Health	Healthcare	372,809	▲4.2%	259,500	Woonsocket, Rhode Island
6	Berkshire Hathaway	Conglomerate	371,433	▲1.9%	392,400	Omaha, Nebraska
7	Alphabet	Technology and cloud computing	350,018	▲13.9%	183,323	Mountain View, California
8	Exxon Mobil	Petroleum	349,595	▲1.5%	60,900	Spring, Texas
9	McKesson Corporation	Healthcare	308,951	▲11.7%	48,000	Irving, Texas
10	Cencora	Pharmacy wholesale	293,959	▲12.1%	44,000	Conshohocken, Pennsylvania
11	JPMorgan Chase	Financials	278,906	▲16.5%	317,233	New York City, New York
12	Costco Wholesale	Retail	254,453	▲5.0%	333,000	Issaquah, Washington
13	Cigna	Health insurance	247,121	▲26.6%	72,398	Bloomfield, Connecticut
14	Microsoft	Technology and cloud computing	245,122	▲15.7%	228,000	Redmond, Washington
15	Cardinal Health	Healthcare	226,827	▲10.6%	48,411	Dublin, Ohio
16	Chevron	Petroleum	202,792	▲0.9%	45,298	Houston, Texas
17	Bank of America	Financials	192,434	▲11.9%	213,193	Charlotte, North Carolina
18	General Motors	Automotive	187,442	▲9.1%	162,000	Detroit, Michigan
19	Ford Motor	Automotive	184,992	▲5.0%	171,000	Dearborn, Michigan
20	Elevance Health	Healthcare	177,011	▲3.3%	103,679	Indianapolis, Indiana
21	Citigroup	Financials	170,757	▲8.9%	227,855	New York City, New York
22	Meta Platforms	Technology	164,501	▲21.9%	74,067	Menlo Park, California
23	Centene	Healthcare	163,071	▲5.9%	60,500	St. Louis, Missouri
24	The Home Depot	Retail	159,514	▲4.5%	470,100	Atlanta, Georgia
25	Fannie Mae	Financials	152,670	▲8.1%	8,200	Washington, D.C.
26	Walgreens Boots Alliance	Pharmaceutical	147,658	▲6.2%	252,500	Deerfield, Illinois
27	Kroger	Retail	147,123	▼ -1.9%	409,000	Cincinnati, Ohio
28	Phillips 66	Petroleum	145,496	▼ -2.9%	13,200	Houston, Texas
29	Marathon Petroleum	Petroleum	140,412	▼ -6.6%	18,300	Findlay, Ohio
30	Verizon Communications	Telecommunications	134,788	▲0.6%	99,600	New York City, New York
31	Nvidia	Technology	130,497	▲114.2%	36,000	Santa Clara, California
32	Goldman Sachs Group	Financials	126,853	▲17.0%	46,500	New York City, New York
33	Wells Fargo	Financials	125,397	▲8.7%	217,502	San Francisco, California
34	Valero Energy	Petroleum	123,974	▼ -10.8%	9,910	San Antonio, Texas
35	Comcast	Telecommunications	123,731	▲1.8%	182,000	Philadelphia, Pennsylvania
36	State Farm Insurance	Financials	122,951	▲18.0%	67,381	Bloomington, Illinois
37	AT&T	Conglomerate and telecommunications	122,336	▼ -0.1%	140,990	Dallas, Texas
38	Freddie Mac	Financials	122,052	▲13.0%	8,090	McLean, Virginia
39	Humana	Health insurance	117,761	▲10.7%	65,680	Louisville, Kentucky
40	Morgan Stanley	Financials	107,285	▲11.5%	80,478	New York City, New York
41	Target	Retail	106,566	▼ -0.8%	440,000	Minneapolis, Minnesota
42	StoneX Group	Financials	99,888	▲64.1%	4,500	New York City, New York
43	Tesla	Automotive and energy	97,690	▲0.9%	125,665	Austin, Texas
44	Dell Technologies	Technology	95,567	▲8.1%	108,000	Round Rock, Texas
45	PepsiCo	Beverage	91,854	▲0.4%	319,000	Purchase, New York
46	Walt Disney	Media	91,361	▲2.8%	205,040	Burbank, California
47	United Parcel Service	Transportation	91,070	▲0.1%	372,180	Atlanta, Georgia
48	Johnson & Johnson	Pharmaceutical	88,821	▼ -6.7%	138,100	New Brunswick, New Jersey
49	FedEx	Transportation	87,693	▼ -2.7%	422,100	Memphis, Tennessee
50	Archer Daniels Midland	Food industry	85,530	▼ -8.9%	43,213	Chicago, Illinois
51	Procter & Gamble	Consumer products manufacturing	84,039	▲2.5%	108,000	Cincinnati, Ohio
52	Lowe's	Retail	83,674	▼ -3.1%	215,500	Mooresville, North Carolina
53	Energy Transfer Partners	Petroleum	82,671	▲5.2%	16,248	Dallas, Texas
54	RTX	Aerospace and defense	80,739	▲17.1%	186,000	Arlington County, Virginia
55	Albertsons	Retail	79,238	▲2.0%	196,650	Boise, Idaho
56	Sysco	Food processing	78,844	▲3.3%	76,000	Houston, Texas
57	Progressive	Insurance	75,372	▲21.4%	66,308	Mayfield Village, Ohio
58	American Express	Financials	74,201	▲10.1%	75,100	New York City, New York
59	Lockheed Martin	Aerospace and defense	71,043	▲5.1%	121,000	Bethesda, Maryland
60	MetLife	Financials	70,986	▲6.1%	45,000	New York City, New York
61	HCA Healthcare	Healthcare	70,603	▲8.7%	271,000	Nashville, Tennessee
62	Prudential Financial	Financials	70,405	▲30.4%	37,936	Newark, New Jersey
63	Boeing	Aerospace and defense	66,517	▼ -14.5%	172,000	Arlington County, Virginia
64	Caterpillar	Machinery	64,809	▼ -3.4%	112,900	Irving, Texas
65	Merck	Pharmaceutical industry	64,168	▲6.7%	74,000	Kenilworth, New Jersey
66	Allstate	Insurance	64,106	▲12.3%	55,200	Northfield Township, Illinois
67	Pfizer	Pharmaceutical industry	63,627	▲8.8%	81,000	New York City, New York
68	IBM	Technology and cloud computing	62,753	▲1.4%	284,500	Armonk, New York
69	New York Life Insurance Company	Insurance	62,639	▲15.3%	15,131	New York City, New York
70	Delta Air Lines	Airline	61,643	▲6.2%	103,000	Atlanta, Georgia
71	Publix Super Markets	Retail	60,177	▲4.6%	255,000	Lakeland, Florida
72	Nationwide Mutual Insurance Company	Financials	58,646	▲7.4%	22,453	Columbus, Ohio
73	TD Synnex	Information Technology	58,452	▲1.6%	25,750	Clearwater, Florida
74	United Airlines Holdings	Airline	57,063	▲6.2%	107,300	Chicago, Illinois
75	ConocoPhillips	Petroleum	56,953	▼ -2.8%	11,800	Houston, Texas
76	TJX	Retail	56,360	▲4.0%	364,000	Framingham, Massachusetts
77	AbbVie	Pharmaceutical	56,334	▲3.7%	55,000	Lake Bluff, Illinois
78	Enterprise Products Partners	Petroleum	56,219	▲13.1%	7,800	Houston, Texas
79	Charter Communications	Telecommunications	55,085	▲0.9%	94,500	Stamford, Connecticut
80	Performance Food Group	Food processing	54,681	▲2.5%	36,815	Richmond, Virginia
81	American Airlines Group	Airline	54,211	▲2.7%	133,300	Fort Worth, Texas
82	Capital One Financial	Financials	53,938	▲9.0%	52,600	Tysons, Virginia
83	Cisco Systems	Telecom hardware manufacturing	53,803	▼ -5.6%	90,400	San Jose, California
84	HP	Technology	53,559	▼ -0.3%	58,000	Palo Alto, California
85	Tyson Foods	Food processing	53,309	▲0.8%	138,000	Springdale, Arkansas
86	Intel	Technology	53,101	▼ -2.1%	108,900	Santa Clara, California
87	Oracle	Technology	52,961	▲6.0%	159,000	Austin, Texas
88	Broadcom	Technology	52,432	▲46.4%	37,000	Palo Alto, California
89	Deere	Agriculture manufacturing	51,716	▼ -15.6%	55,524	Moline, Illinois
90	Nike	Apparel	51,361	▲0.3%	78,400	Beaverton, Oregon
91	Liberty Mutual Insurance Group	Insurance	50,429	▼ -4.1%	40,000	Boston, Massachusetts
92	Plains GP Holdings	Petroleum	50,073	▲2.8%	4,200	Houston, Texas
93	USAA	Insurance	48,560	▲14.3%	38,018	San Antonio, Texas
94	Bristol-Myers Squibb	Pharmaceutical	48,300	▲7.3%	34,100	New York City, New York
95	Ingram Micro Holding	Technology	47,984	▼ -0.1%	26,125	Irvine, California
96	General Dynamics	Aerospace and defense	47,716	▲12.9%	117,000	Reston, Virginia
97	Coca-Cola	Beverage	47,061	▲2.9%	69,700	Atlanta, Georgia
98	TIAA	Financials	46,946	▲2.6%	15,623	New York City, New York
99	Travelers	Insurance	46,423	▲12.2%	34,000	New York City, New York
100	Eli Lilly	Pharmaceutical	45,043	▲32.0%	47,000	Indianapolis, Indiana

== List of largest private companies ==
Below are the 10 largest private companies by revenue in 2025 (mostly for fiscal year 2024), according to Forbes.

Rank	Name	Industry	Revenue (USD billions)	Employees	Headquarters
1	Cargill	Food & Drink	154	155,000	Minnetonka, Minnesota
2	Koch	Multicompany	125	120,000	Wichita, Kansas
3	Publix Super Markets	Food Markets	59.7	260,000	Lakeland, Florida
4	Mars	Food & Drink	55	150,000	McLean, Virginia
5	H-E-B Grocery Company	Food Markets	49.57	175,000	San Antonio, Texas
6	Reyes Holdings	Food, Drink & Tobacco	44	36,000	Rosemont, Illinois
7	Enterprise Mobility	Services	38	100,000	Clayton, Missouri
8	Fidelity Investments	Insurance	32.7	78,000	Boston, Massachusetts
9	Southern Glazer's Wine & Spirits	Food, Drink & Tobacco	25	24,000	Miramar, Florida
10	Cox Enterprises	Media	23.5	50,000	Atlanta, Georgia

== List of companies by profit ==
The 10 most profitable companies in 2025 (for fiscal year 2024), according to the Fortune 500.

Rank	Name	Industry	Profits (USD millions)	Headquarters
1	Alphabet	Technology and cloud computing	100,118	Mountain View, California
2	Apple	Technology	93,736	Cupertino, California
3	Berkshire Hathaway	Conglomerate	88,995	Omaha, Nebraska
4	Microsoft	Technology and cloud computing	88,136	Redmond, Washington
5	Nvidia	Technology	72,880	Santa Clara, California
6	Meta Platforms	Technology	62,360	Menlo Park, California
7	Amazon	Retail and cloud computing	59,248	Seattle, Washington
8	JPMorgan Chase	Financials	58,471	New York City, New York
9	ExxonMobil	Petroleum industry	33,680	Spring, Texas
10	Bank of America	Financials	27,132	Charlotte, North Carolina

== See also ==
- List of public corporations by market capitalization
- List of companies of the United States by state
- List of largest companies by revenue
