= Halima Cassell =

British sculptor and ceramicist

Halima Jade Cassell MBE FRSS (born 1975) is a British sculptor and ceramicist working in many materials. She was born in Pakistan and brought up in Lancashire, England, now living in Shropshire. Her work is described as having "strong geometric elements and recurrent patterns that are often inspired by the repetitive motifs found in Islamic architecture and North African surface design".

== Early life and education ==
Cassell was born in Kashmir, Pakistan, and moved to Lancashire, England with her family as a child. She has a BTEC National Diploma in Art and Design from Blackburn College (1994), a BA (hons) in 3D design (1997) and an MA in Design (2002) from University of Central Lancashire (1997), and a PDQ in Technology for Designer Makers (2003) from Manchester City College.

== Career ==
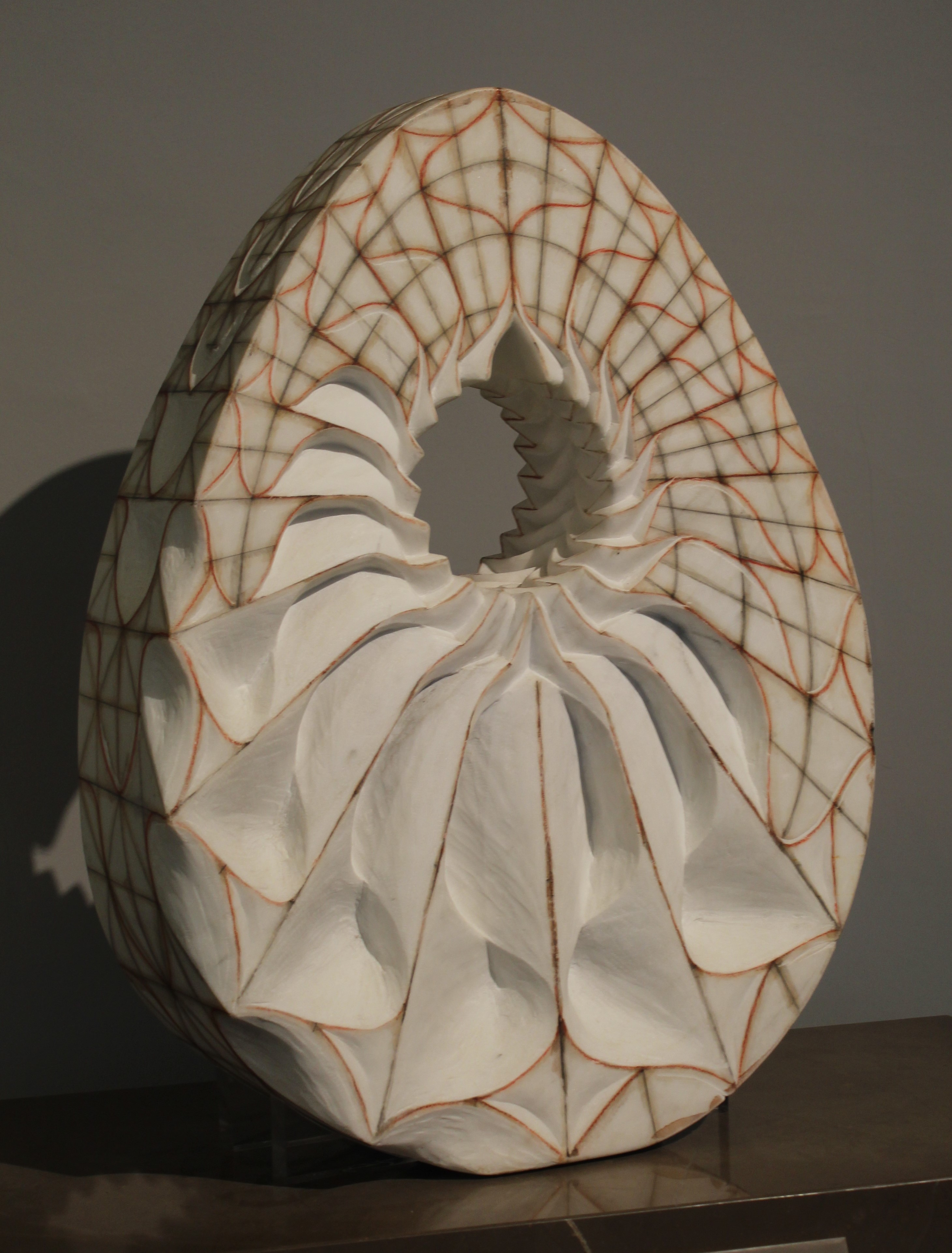
Bow Wave, 2012, Victoria and Albert Museum, London

Cassell had a major exhibition, Halima Cassell: Eclectica–global inspirations, at Manchester Art Gallery from 2 February 2019 to 5 January 2020. She describes her work as "Combining strong geometric elements with recurrent patterns and architectural principles".

Her works are held in many public collections in the UK including the Victoria and Albert Museum (Dark Trivalve, 2008) and the Birmingham Museum and Art Gallery (Calliope, 2013, purchased with funding from the Art Fund).

Her public art can be seen in Blackburn, the Forest of Bowland, the Ribble Valley (six ceramic works in the Ribble Valley Sculpture Trail), Leicester, Nottingham and Liverpool.

In 2018 Cassell won the Sovereign Asian Art Prize for her bronze work Acapella.

Cassell is a Fellow of the Royal Society of Sculptors.

Cassell was appointed Member of the Order of the British Empire (MBE) in the 2021 New Year Honours for services to art.

== Style ==
Cassell's carved forms are inspired by architecture and geometry as well as natural shapes. She works in high-relief which in turn creates a "play of light and shadow on the forms". Commonly, Cassell works using bronze, ceramics, glass, stone, and wood, however she has been known to use other materials such as wallpaper. These natural materials match the simplicity of the forms she uses as the basis of her works, in doing so, Cassell heightens the impact of the "complex surface patterns" and dramatic angles. Consequently, her works create an "unsettling sense of movement."

Her style has been described as "instantly recognisable due to her bold, energetic designs, crisp carving and her deep understanding of how to integrate pattern, form, material and scale".

She was inspired by the repetitive motifs found in North African surface design, Islamic designs, and English architecture in her early career.

In more recent years Cassell's works have been enriched by her travels throughout Britain and Italy, Japan and Pakistan. Her interest in patterns, geometry and symmetry has given way to organic curves and asymmetrical forms. Subsequently, Cassell's work has been influenced by an emphasis on the balance between masculine and feminine contours.

She has gone on to use new materials to present her ideas and designs, one being wallpaper. Cassell's designs are textured and embossed, and display different levels of surface to capture and reflect the light.

== Selected publications ==
- Cassell, Halima (2004). Carved Earth. Shisha. ISBN 978-0954556341.
