= Susan Gunn =

British artist

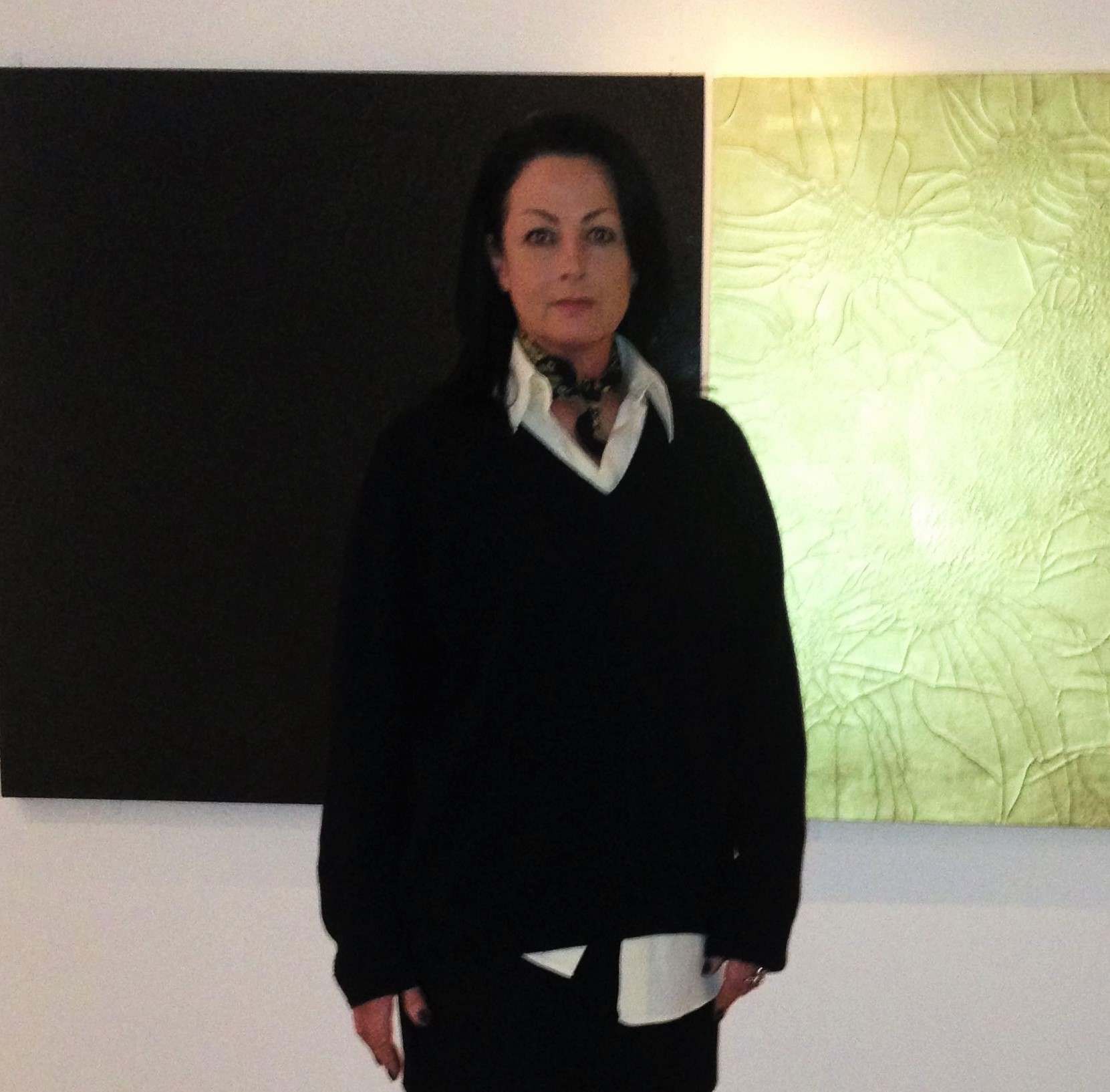
- Artist Susan Gunn at an exhibition in 2012
- Born: 1965 (age 60–61); Manchester, England
- Education: Norwich University of the Arts
- Occupation: Artist
- Spouse: Bryan Gunn
- Children: 3, including Angus
- Website: Susan Gunn Artist

Susan Gunn is a British artist. She was born in present-day Greater Manchester, England in 1965, and studied at Norwich University of the Arts where she was awarded a First Class BA Honours in Fine Art Painting in 2004. In 2006 she was awarded the inaugural Sovereign European Art Prize. In 2014 she was commissioned to create a twenty-metre painting for the £11.6 million low carbon building project 'The Enterprise Centre' at the University of East Anglia in Norwich. She is a member of Contemporary British Painting.

Gunn's artworks are made using traditional binders imbued with beeswax and linseed, natural earth pigments and layers of traditionally made gesso. The surface undergoes a natural process beyond the control of the artist and renders each painting unique.

== The Sovereign European Art Prize ==
Gunn was awarded the inaugural Sovereign European Art Prize in 2006 ahead of 300 artists from over twenty countries with her 10 feet high red painting, Specto Specus I & II. Sir Peter Blake, one of the judges, said of her work "I think she is a very talented artist and her paintings are incredibly beautiful objects."

== Selected collections ==
- The Priseman Seabrook Collection, England
- Norfolk Museums Collection, England
- Swindon Museum & Art Gallery, England
- The Archant Collection; Arts Council England, East Collection
- The Sovereign Art Foundation Collection, Hong Kong

== Selected exhibitions ==
- 2016 – Ground, The Portico Library, Manchester, England
- 2016 – Group Exhibition: Priseman Seabrook Collection, The Minories, Colchester, England
- 2016 – Mandell's Gallery, Norwich, England
- 2014 – East Contemporary Art: Place and Landscape, Waterfront Gallery, UCS, Ipswich, England
- 2011 – Crossroads, Candlestar; International Women's Day Exhibition, London
- 2011 – The Gallery at NUA, Norwich, England

== Personal life ==
Gunn was interested in art at a young age attending a foundation course in art at Bolton College, England, she did not complete the course leaving at the age of eighteen to pursue a career in modelling and later launch a fashion business. She is married to Bryan Gunn, a former professional footballer and football manager, who she met in Spain, where she had a bridal wear company. He proposed within three days of their meeting, and they were married the following year. They lived in Framingham Pigot, near Norwich, until moving to Cheshire in May 2011. The Gunns have had three children: Francesca, Melissa and Angus. Their first child Francesca was diagnosed with leukaemia and died aged two. Melissa is a model, while their son, Angus, is a professional footballer and plays as a goalkeeper, as did his father.
