= Edward C. Raymund =

American businessman

- Born: August 26, 1928; Hollywood, California
- Died: December 9, 2008 (aged 80); Mission Viejo, California
- Education: University of Southern California
- Occupation: Entrepreneur
- Known for: Founder of Tech Data Corp.
- Spouses: Annette Leah Raymund; Tricia Raymund
- Children: with Annette Leah Raymund: --Lena Raymund Rogachevky --Karen Raymund Marder --Suzanne Raymund Zigun --Steve A. Raymund with Tricia Madison: --Matthew Madison Raymund
- Family: Monica Raymund (granddaughter)

Edward Charles Raymund (August 26, 1928 – December 9, 2008) was an American businessman and the founder of Tech Data Corp.

== Biography ==
Raymund was born to poor family on August 26, 1928 in Hollywood, California, and raised in Los Angeles. He served in the Army Air Corps and attended the University of Southern California on the G.I. Bill. After school, he worked as an electronics manufacturer's representative in Southern California. He moved to Florida eight years later where he saw an opportunity due to the state's rapid growth; and in the 1960s, he was distributing high-volume sockets and capacitors. In 1974, he founded Tech Data which initially sold computer memory cassettes, floppy disks, and printer ribbons; and added monitors, printers, add-on cards, and eventually IBM PCs in the 1980s. In 1985, his son, Steven Raymund, became CEO. Raymund remained as chairman of Tech Data until 1991; thereafter he held the title of chairman emeritus.

== Philanthropy ==
Raymund was a supporter of the Noble Vikings of Orange County Charity, Mission Hospital, St. Margaret's Episcopal School, the Mission of San Juan Capistrano, the San Juan Capistrano Historical Society, The Boys and Girls Club of San Juan Capistrano, the OJAI Museum of Art, Newport Sports Museum, the Defense Orientation Conference Association, and the USC Trojans football team.

== Personal life ==
Raymund was married twice. His first wife was Annette Leah Raymund, who was Jewish. They had four children: Lena Raymund Rogachevky, Karen Raymund Marder, Suzanne Raymund Zigun, and Steve A. Raymund. His second wife was Tricia Madison; they had one child: Matthew Madison Raymund. He died on December 9, 2008, in Mission Viejo, California. Services were held at St. Margaret's Episcopal Church in San Juan Capistrano, California. His son, Steve, served as CEO of Tech Data from 1986 until 2006.

His granddaughter is actress Monica Raymund.
