= Tsang Kin-Wah =

Tsang Kin-Wah (Chinese: 曾建華) is a visual artist based in Hong Kong. His earlier work, particularly his "wallpaper art", was known for its combination of beautiful illustration and painting, and for its use of profane or obscene words. More recently, he has explored topics related to politics and religion via large-form, multi-media installations that combine music, video and light projections.

== Early life and education ==
Tsang was born in Shantou, Guangdong Province, China, and moved to Hong Kong as a young child. He studied art at the Chinese University of Hong Kong and the Camberwell College of Arts in London on a Chevening Scholarship.

== Wallpaper Art ==
Close-up of a piece of wallpaper art by Tsang Kin-Wah

His wallpaper art creates large-scale wallpaper installations that evoke the floral designs of William Morris in a style that has become known as word-art installation. It combines foul language with floral patterns (the text is arranged to form flowers and plants), highlighting the organic force intertwining nature and human; the surface being the text and the attached emotions as shouts to be discovered by the visitor.

== Multimedia installations ==
Kin-Wah Tsang's most recent work explores topics in philosophy, religion, and popular culture through immersive multimedia installations. One of the first such installations was "Ecce Homo Trilogy”. The installation's idea is centered upon "Ecce Homo", a phrase that was both used by Pontius Pilate at the last judgment and as the title of a book by Nietzsche. By placing these two references together, Tsang questions the impartialness of judgment.

The next major installation was "The Infinite Nothing,” a phrase also coming from Nietzsche. The installation consists of separate video installations that represent transformative journeys through stages in life. Following up on this work, his latest work "Nothing" continues to explore the idea of existence. It is the first commissioned exhibit of the $3 billion West Kowloon Cultural District.

== Prizes and commissions ==
- In 2005, at the age of 29, Tsang won the US $25,000 Sovereign Art Foundation Prize.
- In 2014, he was chosen to represent Hong Kong at the 2015 Venice Biennale.
- In 2016, he created the first solo show for the West Kowloon Cultural District. at M+ Pavilion.
- In 2016, Tsang is part of a major group show of Chinese artists at the Guggenheim museum in New York. For example, see In The End Is The Word at the Guggenheim Museum.

== Museum and other collections ==
- A3 Collection, Kadist Art Foundation, USA
- Asian Art Museum, USA
- Burger Collection, Zurich, Switzerland
- Camberwell College of Arts, the London Institute, London
- CODA Museum, Apeldoorn, The Netherlands
- Deutsche Bank Collection, Hong Kong
- DSL Collection, Paris
- Guggenheim Museum, New York
- MAXXI, Rome
- Mori Art Museum, Tokyo
- Museum of Design Zurich, Switzerland
- Hong Kong Heritage Museum, Hong Kong
- Hong Kong Museum of Art, Hong Kong
- M+ Museum, Hong Kong
- New Asia College, The Chinese University of Hong Kong
- Sovereign Art Foundation, Hong Kong
- The Sigg Collection, Switzerland
- UBS Art Collection
- William Lim's Living Collection, Hong Kong
