= Sovereign Art Foundation =

The Sovereign Art Foundation (SAF) is a non-profit organisation established in 2003 by Howard Bilton, a tax lawyer and today's chairman of the Sovereign Group.

Originally a charity, the SAF works towards raising money to help disadvantaged children in Asia and using the arts as a form of rehabilitation, education and therapy. In 2013, the SAF set up the Make It Better project (MIB) that allows for weekly art therapy workshops to take place across Hong Kong and Asia, mostly focusing on under-privileged families' children.

In 2003, Howard Bilton transformed his art-collecting hobby into what is now Asia's largest art prize: The Sovereign Asian Art Prize. This prize, hosted annually in Hong Kong, is a visual arts competition among 30 finalists whose work is then auctioned to raise funds for the MIB project and other charities. The prize initially focused on artists working in the medium of painting only but have since expanded to include other 2D media, including photography, drawing, and print, as well as 3D sculptures.

The Sovereign Art Foundation invites a network of experts from either Europe, Asia or Africa to nominate artists to participate in the prizes. During the exhibition the final judging is performed live and the winner of the US$30,000 first prize is announced and an additional US$1,000 is given to the artist with the public vote for best work. At the culmination of the exhibition there is a charity gala auction where the finalists' works, excluding the first prize winner, are auctioned, with half the proceeds going to the foundation and the other half going back to the artist.

Since 2007, the SAF have expanded their work towards Europe with The Sovereign European Art Prize (held in 2007, 2009, 2010 and 2011), the Middle East with The Sovereign Middle East and North Africa Art Prize in 2016 and the rest of Africa with The 2011 African Art Prize.

In addition, Sovereign Art Foundation Students Art Prizes are awarded in a number of countries including Hong Kong, Bahrain, Guernsey, the Isle of Man, Malta, Mauritius, Portugal and Singapore.

== Charity and funding ==
The Sovereign Art Foundation has used the funds raised through the art prizes it runs to support various charities that help disadvantaged children using the arts as rehabilitation, education and therapy. Three specific examples are Make It Better (founded by SAF), M'Lop Tapang and the Kalki Welfare Society.

=== Make it Better ===
In 2013 The Sovereign Art Foundation (SAF) launched the Make It Better Project (MIB), an initiative designed for children from low-income families and those with special educational needs. In Hong Kong, many individuals struggle with extreme financial hardship. They and their families may consequently face social isolation and discrimination. Make It Better aims to support these children by offering them empowering learning activities reinforced by expressive arts. MIB runs weekly workshops in partnership with experienced organisations and schools that help identify those children most in need of support.

=== M'Lop Tapang ===
M'Lop Tapang works jointly with children and their families to access education, health care, counselling, income generation initiatives and other services needed to secure a better future. It also works in the community to increase awareness about issues affecting street children, in particular abuse, amongst local people, police, teachers and government officials, helping to make the community a safer place for children. The Sovereign Art Foundation is working with M'Lop Tapang to create a two-year arts programme to help them teach new skills to the disadvantaged children of the area.

=== Kalki Welfare Society ===
The Kalki Welfare Society is a non-profit organisation working for vulnerable children of Pondicherry, India and nearby areas. Since June 2008 Kalki has striven to provide a better opportunity to street and other vulnerable children living in very poor conditions, offering them the chance to become active players in their lives. The Sovereign Art Foundation is working with the Kalki Welfare Society to establish an arts project for the disadvantaged children it supports.

=== Other beneficiary charities ===
The Sovereign Art Foundation has also supported Kids Company, The Prince's Foundation for Children & the Arts, Room to Read, The Peace Art Cambodia Project and the Hong Kong Youths Art Foundation to name just a few. Over the years the Foundation has raised in excess of US$2 million for charitable activities. The Sovereign Group is the main sponsor of the Sovereign Art Foundation. Sovereign pays all the administrative expenses, salaries, office costs and the prize money. Partners are sought for the sponsorship of the key events and previous exhibitions and auction dinners have been supported by Louis Vuitton, Bulgari, Barclays Wealth, Jaeger Le Coultre, Cathay Pacific, Sotheby's, ADM Capital, Sutton and many others.

== Prizes ==
=== The Sovereign Asian Art Prize (SAAP) ===
The Sovereign Asian Art Prize was initiated in 2003 when the Sovereign Art Foundation was established as a charity in Hong Kong and is the Sovereign Art Foundation's most established prize having had over 2000 artists in the region submit entries in its history.

The prize follows the format explained earlier. Entry is by nomination only. All entries are then judged by a renowned judging panel that has a strong authority in contemporary Asian art. This is the first part of a two part judging process where the 30 strongest pieces will be the art prize finalists. The finalists are usually exhibited in a prominent public place in Hong Kong. In 2010, the finalist exhibition was for the first time toured in Singapore and in Hong Kong. In 2011, the finalist exhibition will be toured in Shanghai, Seoul, Singapore and then finally in Hong Kong. (see: The Sovereign Asian Art Prize). The second part of the judging process will take place live, at the exhibition in Hong Kong where the art prize winner will be announced. The 29 remaining pieces will then be auctioned off by a chosen auction house (Christie's in 2019 and Sotheby's various other years) at a charity dinner where 50% of the proceeds of each sale will go to the artist and the other 50% will go to the foundation. All proceeds made on the evening by the foundation will go directly towards its charitable aims (see above).

Additionally, the award also includes the "Schoeni Prize" which is named in memory of Manfred Schoeni who died in 2004. This prize is decided solely by public votes cast at the exhibition and through the Sovereign Art Foundation website. The prize carries a nominal award of US$1,000.

As well as raising funds to assist art projects in Asia, The Sovereign Asian Art Prize strives to recognise the most innovative and influential artists of our time.

==== Winners ====
Year	Artist	Country
2019	Ahmed Javed	Pakistan
2018	Halima Cassell	Pakistan
2017	Yogie Achmad Ginanjar	Indonesia
2016 – 2015	Baptist Coelho	India
2014	Anida Yoeu ALi	Cambodia
2013 – 2012	Laurent Gutierrez and Valerie Portefaix	Hong Kong
2011	Jeongmee Yoon	Republic of Korea
2010	Pala Pothupitiye	Sri Lanka
2009	Debbie Han	Korea
2008	Chow Chun Fai	Hong Kong
2007	Kumi Machida	Japan
2006	Uttaporn Nimmalaikaew	Thailand
2005	Tsang Kin-Wah	Hong Kong
2004	Jeffrey Du Vallier D'Aragon Aranits	Hong Kong

Judges
2004	2005	2006	2007	2008	2009	2010	2011
Sir David Akers-Jones	Jeffrey Du Vallier D'Aragon Aranits	Ark Fongsmut	David Elliot	Peter Aspden	David Elliot	David Elliot	David Elliot
Professor Chan Yuk Keung	Professor Chan Yuk Keung	Fumio Nanjo	Jean-Baptiste Debains	Xu Bing	Xu Bing	Xu BIng	Sunhee Kim
Dr Christina Chu	Dr Christina Hsu	Dr Alice Guillermo	Victoria Lu	Victoria Lu	Fumio Nanjo	Fumio Nanjo	Fumio Nanjo
Claire Hsu	Claire Hsu	Claire Hsu	Bridget Tracy Tan	Uli Sigg	Uli Sigg	Tan Boon Hui	William Zhao
Angelina Bleach		Robert Lee	Pamela Kember	Pamela Kember	Dr Apinan Poshyananda	Lars Nittve	Lars Nittve
		Dr Gao Shiming		Pooja Sood		Graham Sheffield	Jerome Sans
		Enin Supriyanto				Sir David Tang	Gu Wenda
2012–2013		2014	2015–2016		2017	2018	2019
David Elliot		David Elliot	David Elliot		David Elliot	David Elliot	David Elliot
Sunhee Kim		Sunhee Kim	Song Dong		Alexandra A. Seno	Alexandra A. Seno	Jan Dalley
Fumio Nanjo		Fumio Nanjo	Michael Lin		Jim Supangkat	Fumio Nanjo	William Lim
Lars Nittve		Rachel Kent	Cosmin Costinas		Michael Snelling	Jan Dalley	Zhang Huan
Emi Eu		Emi Eu	Asmudjo Irianto		Miao Xiochun	Rashid Rana	Mami Kataoka
Philip Tinari		Lauren Cameron					
Tim Marlow		Joey Lau					

=== The Sovereign European Art Prize ===
The Sovereign European Art Prize was established in 2006 following the success of the Sovereign Asian Art Prize in London. The prize has since had over 1,500 artist entries from the European region.

The European art prize runs on the same format as the African and Asian prize. Entry is by nomination only. All entries are then judged by a renowned judging panel that has a strong authority in contemporary European art. This is the first part of a two part judging process where the 30 strongest pieces will be the art prize finalists. In the past the 30 finalists have been exhibited in London but in 2011 this will move to The 2010 European capital of culture, Istanbul. The second stage of the judging process will be carried out live at the exhibition where the art prize winner will be announced, who will receive US$25,000. The remaining 29 finalist art works will be auctioned off in the same format as the Asian Art Prize, where 50% of the proceeds will go to the artist and the other 50% to the foundation.

The beneficial charity of The 2011 Sovereign European Art Prize was Acik Kapi, a local Turkish charity whose primary concern is providing shelter for homeless children, who will use the funding to establish an arts program at their centre.

As well as raising funds to assist art projects in Europe, The Sovereign European Art Prize strives to recognize the most innovative and influential artists of our time.

Winners
Year	Artist	Country
2005	Susan Gunn	United Kingdom
2007	Damien Cadio	France
2008	Nadia Hebson	Germany
2009–10	David Birkin	United Kingdom

Judges
Judge	Year	Judge	Year	Judge	Year
Ami Barak	2006, 2007, 2009–10	Charles Esche	2006	Robert Punkenhofer	2009–10
Sir Peter Blake	2006, 2007	Isabel Carlos	2007	Joseph Backstein	2009–10
Jorge Molder	2006, 2007	Bruce McLean	2007	Gavin Turk	2009–10
Shaheen Merali	2006, 2007	Enzo Di Martino	2007	Nasser Azam	2009–10
Giorgio Bonomi	2006	Eric Corne	2007	Ali Akay	2011
Chalotta Kotik	2006	Jiří David	2007	Marc-Olivier Wahler	2011
Angela Flowers	2006	Susan Gunn	2009–10	Başak Senova	2011
Professor Janwillem Schrofer	2006	Tim Marlow	2009–10, 2011		
Bryan Ferry	2006	Philly Adams	2009–10, 2011		

=== The Sovereign African Art Prize ===
In 2011, the Sovereign Art Foundation held the Sovereign African Art Prize for the Sovereign Art Foundation in Africa. Its aim was to (i) raise public awareness of African art; (ii) provide much needed exposure, recognition and opportunity to African artists; and (iii) raise significant funding for charities in Africa.

Contrary to the Asian Art Prize, the 2011 Sovereign African Art Prize only consisted of 20 finalists, chosen by expert nominators, that were exposed on 24–25 September at the Johannesburg Art Fair. The Winner for the prize was artists Hassan Hajjaj from Morocco.

Judges
2011
Robert Devereux
Julian Ozanne
Simon Njami
Jean Pigozzi
Riason Naidoo

=== The 2016 Sovereign Middle East & North Africa (MENA) Art Prize ===
The 2016 Sovereign Middle East & North Africa (MENA) Art Prize was held in 2016 in Dubai and strive towards encouraging and supporting North African and Middle-Easter artists. It follows, once again, the same criteria as the Asian Art Prize with a selection of specialized and expert judges and nominators. The winner of the 2016 Sovereign Middle East & North Africa Art Prize was Alfred Tarazi, an artist from Lebanon followed by the Public Vote Prize won by Mayasa Al Sowaidi.

=== The Sovereign Student Art Prize ===
In 2012 SAF established The Sovereign Art Foundation Students Prize in Hong Kong, with the purpose of celebrating the importance of art in the education system and recognizing the quality of art that can be produced by secondary and tertiary level students in Hong Kong. Teachers and department heads from secondary schools and universities are invited to nominate their best art students to enter the prize.

After two rounds of judging both online and in person, the final shortlisted works are exhibited in a prominent space, usually an art fair, where the public are invited to vote on their favourite piece.

The winning students and their schools are awarded with cash prizes.

The Sovereign Art Foundation has now established additional Students Prizes in Bahrain, Guernsey, the Isle of Man, Malta, Mauritius, Portugal and Singapore, with further Students Prizes planned worldwide.
