= Framingham Pigot =

Village in Norfolk, England

Coordinates: 52.583°N 1.357°E

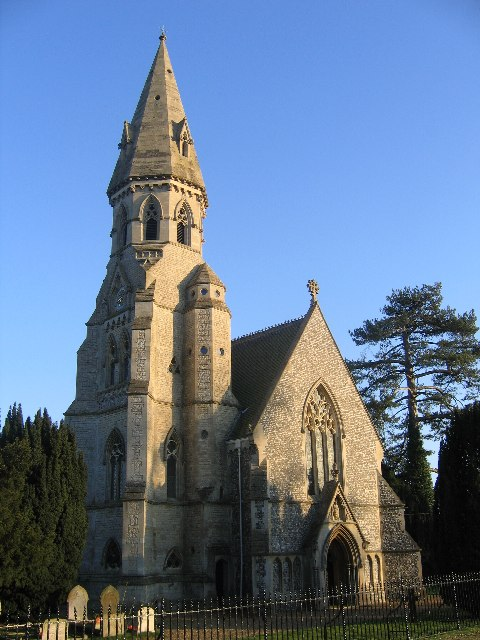
- St Andrew's Church, Framingham Pigot

- Location within Norfolk
- Area: 0.99 sq mi (2.6 km^{2})
- Population: 168 (2021 census)
  - Density: 170/sq mi (66/km^{2})
- OS grid reference: TG271038
  - London: 97 miles (156 km)
- Civil parish: Framingham Pigot
- District: South Norfolk
- Shire county: Norfolk
- Region: East
- Country: England
- Sovereign state: United Kingdom
- Post town: NORWICH
- Postcode district: NR14
- Dialling code: 01603
- Police: Norfolk
- Fire: Norfolk
- Ambulance: East of England
- UK Parliament: South Norfolk

Framingham Pigot is a village and civil parish in the English county of Norfolk.

Framingham Pigot is located 6.4 miles (10.3 km) north-west of Loddon and 3.9 miles (6.3 km) south-east of Norwich, along the A146 between Norwich and Lowestoft.

== History ==
Framingham Earl's name is of Anglo-Saxon origin and derives from the Old English for the village or homestead of Fram's people. The addition of 'Pigot' was added due to the fact the village was part of the estates of the Picot family in the 13th century.

It is likely that a Roman road passed through Framingham Pigot, going eastwards from Venta Icenorum.

In the Domesday Book of 1086, Framingham Pigot is listed alongside Framingham Earl as a settlement of 61 households in the hundred of Henstead. In 1086, the villages were divided between the East Anglian estates of King William I, Bishop Odo of Bayeux, Roger Bigod and Godric the Steward.

During the Napoleonic Wars, the Gull pub was a meeting place for the officers of the Norfolk Militia who held training exercises on nearby Bramerton Common.

Framingham Hall was a manor-house built in the parish in the 18th century, with the wooded grounds around the hall being planted by the Rigby family. The hall was demolished in the 1970s.

== Geography ==
According to the 2021 census, Framingham Pigot has a total population of 168 people which demonstrates an increase from the 153 people listed in the 2011 census.

The A146, between Norwich and Lowestoft, passes through the parish.

== St Andrew's Church ==
Framingham Pigot's parish church is dedicated to Saint Andrew and dates from the Nineteenth Century. St. Andrew's is located within the village on 'The Street and has been Grade II listed since 1988. The church still holds services on a sporadic basis.

St Andrew's was built on the site of a previous round-tower church by Robert Kerr in 1859, who was funded by George Christie, the Lord of the Manor. The church also features a variety of stained-glass windows installed by the workshops of Hardman & Co., Franz Mayer of Munich, Archibald Keightley Nicholson and Clayton and Bell.

== Amenities ==
Framingham Pigot has two remaining public houses, the Old Feathers and the Gull Inn. The Highway Nursery, a garden centre, is also located in the parish.

== Notable residents ==
- Bryan Gunn- (born 1963) Scotland and Norwich City goalkeeper and manager, lived in Framingham Pigot.
- Susan Gunn- (born 1965) artist, lived in Framingham Pigot.
- Munya Chawawa- (born 1992) Anglo-Zimbabwean actor and comedian, lived in Framingham Pigot.
- Angus Gunn- (born 1996) Norwich City and Southampton F.C. goalkeeper, grew-up in Framingham Pigot.

== Governance ==
Framingham Pigot is part of the electoral ward of Poringland, Framinghams & Trowse for local elections and is part of the district of South Norfolk.

The village's national constituency is South Norfolk which has been represented by the Labour's Ben Goldsborough MP since 2024.

== War memorial ==
Framingham Pigot's war memorials are a set of carved marble plaques in St. Andrew's Church. The memorial lists the following names for the First World War:

Rank	Name	Unit	Date of death	Burial/Commemoration
Capt.	Julian F. Gray MC	Royal Engineers	10 Jul. 1918	Ramleh War Cemetery
ASn.	Cecil G. Rivett	5th (Nelson) Bn., Royal Naval Division	15 Apr. 1917	Arras Memorial
Pte.	Clifford J. Tomlinson	10th Bn., Lincolnshire Regiment	20 Sep. 1917	Tincourt Cemetery
Pte.	Arthur T. Baker	9th Bn., Norfolk Regiment	30 Nov. 1917	Cambrai Memorial

The following names were added after the Second World War:

Rank	Name	Unit	Date of death	Burial/Commemoration
Capt.	Patrick R. Lockett	17th/21st Lancers	21 Feb. 1943	Medjez-El-Bab Memorial
Lt.	David W. J. Colman	2nd Bn., King's Royal Rifle Corps	5 Nov. 1942	El Alamein Cemetery
Cpl.	Guy R. Taylor	22 (Fortress) Coy., Royal Engineers	17 Oct. 1942	Yokohama War Cemetery
Pte.	Alfred B. Cushing	2nd Bn., Royal Norfolk Regiment	25 May 1940	Mont-Bernanchon Cemetery
Pte.	Leonard W. G. Cain	7th Bn., Royal Norfolks	8 Aug. 1944	Bayeux War Cemetery
