= Jeongmee Yoon =

South Korean photographer

- 윤정미
- Born: 1969 (age 56–57)
- Education: School of Visual Arts
- Known for: Photography
- Notable work: Lauren and Carolyn and Their Pink & Purple Things; The Pink and Blue Project; Space-Man-Space; Animal Companions
- Awards: Sovereign Asian Art Prize – Grand Prize in Asian Art; 2011 Lauren and Carolyn and Their Pink & Purple Things

- Jeongmee Yoon
- Hangul: 윤정미
- Hanja: 尹丁美
- RR: Yun Jeongmi
- MR: Yun Chŏngmi

Jeongmee Yoon (Korean: 윤정미; born 1969) is a South Korean photographer. She received an MFA in photography, video, and related media from the School of Visual Arts in 2006, and is a professor of photography at Hongik University in Seoul, South Korea.

Yoon's photography often focuses on human subjects posed within a densely-packed frame among their possessions. Yoon has stated that "[t]his method shows my organization of subjects similar to the way in which museums categorize their inventories and display their collections." As art critic Hyeyoung Shin observes, "Unlike a portrait photography, which focuses only [on] a person, [Yoon] provides environmental information surrounding the subject to contribute not only the visual content but also its form."

Yoon's most notable photography series in this vein is the Pink and Blue Project, which Yoon began in 2005. The Pink and Blue Project documents the blue and pink toys, clothing, books, and other objects collected by American and Korean children. This project is regularly referenced by scholars studying gender and early childhood in a range of fields, including biology, educational psychology, and media studies. Another photography series, Space-Man-Space, depicts shopkeepers surrounded by the goods they sell, in tightly packed stalls and kiosks in Seoul's Insadong neighborhood. Similarly, the Animal Companions photo series chronicles relationships between humans, their pets, and the homes they live in.

In 2011, Yoon won the Grand Prize in Asian Art from the Sovereign Art Foundation for her work "Lauren and Carolyn and Their Pink & Purple Things." Her work is included in the collections of the Prints and Photographs Division of the Library of Congress, the Museum of Fine Arts Houston, and the Philadelphia Museum of Art.
