= Stream Global Services =

Business process outsourcing company

sgs, Inc.
- Company type: Public
- Industry: Business process outsourcing, offshoring
- Founded: 1 January 1992
- Headquarters: Eagan, Minnesota, U.S.
- Revenue: ▲US$800.173 million (2010)
- Operating income: ▼US-$14.762 million (2010)
- Number of employees: 37,000+ (2013)
- Website: stream.com

Stream Global Services (formerly known as Global BPO Services Corp.), was a BPO company acquired by Convergys through a definitive merger, together with more than 37,000 employees in 22 countries and 50 contact centers. The company's footprint includes countries across North America, Europe, Asia Pacific, Latin America, the Middle East and Africa.

== History ==
Global BPO Services Corp. was founded by R. Scott Murray in 2007. Global BPO Services raised $250 million in an IPO of a Special Purpose Acquisition Corp in October 2007. It closed the acquisition of Stream Holdings Corporation in July 2008 for $300 million in cash and assumption of debt. In connection with the acquisition of Stream, the company completed a private stock sale to Ares Management for $150 million and a tender offer for most of the publicly held shares of Stream, except those held by the founders of Global BPO Services.

On October 1, 2009, Stream Global Services, Inc. acquired e-Telecare in a stock-for-stock merger valued at approximately $225 million. e-Telecare brought over 10,000 employees and substantial operations in the Philippines. In connection with the merger, the company raised $200 million in a public debt offering led by Goldman Sachs.

The combined company provided customer management and information management products.

In 2010, Chairman and CEO R. Scott Murray resigned to return to the investment industry. On June 1, 2011, Trillium Capital LLC, owned by R. Scott Murray, the founder and former CEO of Stream, offered to acquire 100% of Stream for $4.65 per share plus assumption of debt. The non-binding proposal also included a provision to extend the exercisability of the public warrants by two years that would otherwise expire in October 2011. The transaction had a total enterprise value of approximately $575 million. The offer was subsequently turned down by the private equity shareholders, represented by Ares Capital, Providence Equity Partners, and Ayala Corporation. Trillium Capital LLC and R Scott Murray agreed to sell their ownership back to the company. Stream was subsequently taken private in 2012 by the three private equity owners at the same price Trillium Capital sold its shares to the company.

== Convergys acquisition ==
On January 6, 2014, Convergys and Stream announced entry into a definitive merger. Under the agreement, Convergys will acquire Stream for a total enterprise value of $820 Million in cash.
