= Convergys =

American call center software company

Convergys Corporation

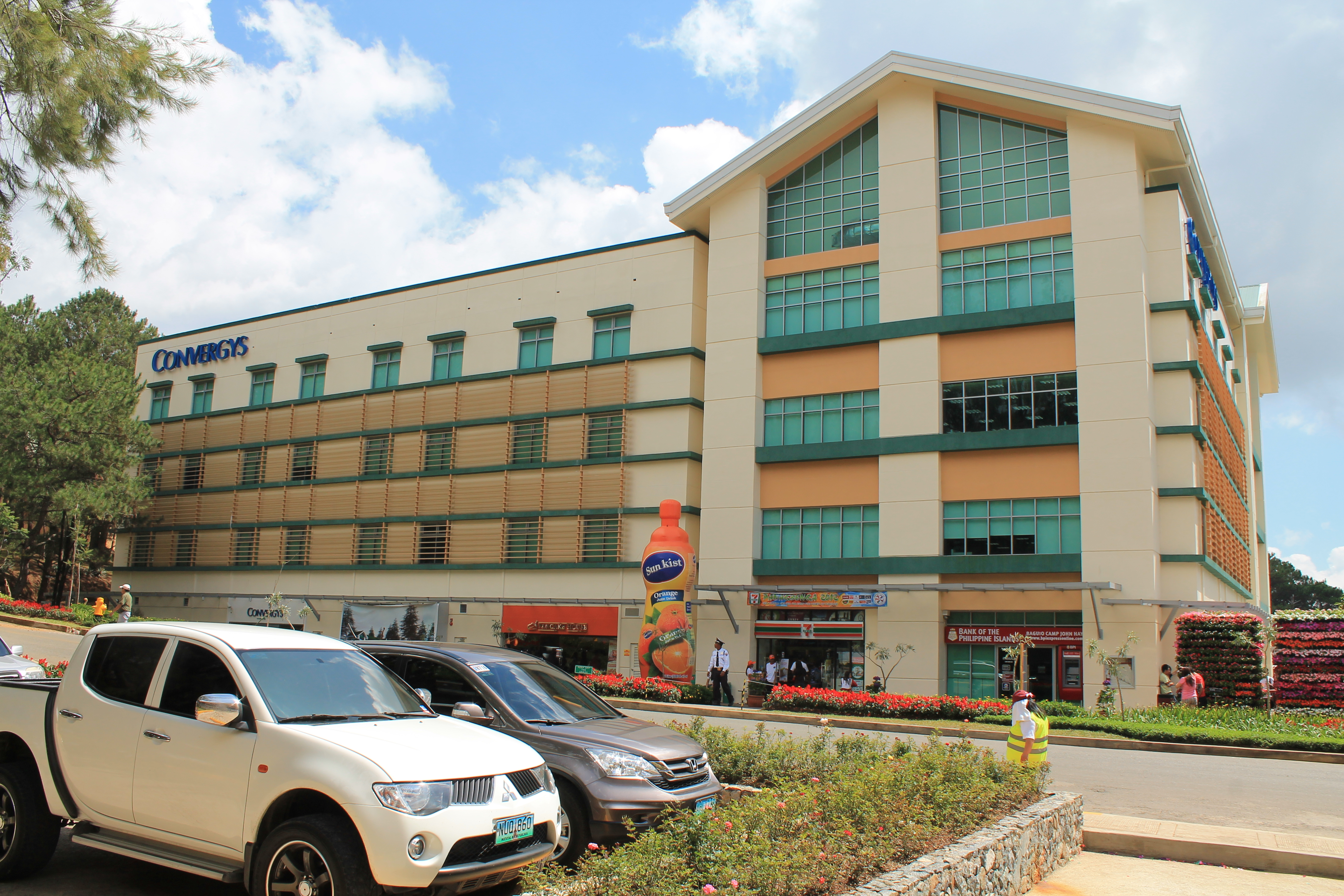
- Convergys office in Baguio, Philippines
- Type: Public
- Traded as: NYSE: CVG
- Industry: Customer Management; Information Management; Outsourcing; Consulting; Professional Services
- Founded: 1998
- Defunct: October 5, 2018
- Fate: Acquired by Synnex
- Successor: Concentrix
- Headquarters: Cincinnati, Ohio, United States
- Number of locations: 150
- Key people: Andrea Ayers (CEO); Andre S. Valentine (CFO); Claudia Cline (Exec VP/General Counsel); Michael L Wooden (CCO); Marjorie Connelly (COO)
- Products: Infinys Rating and Billing (IRB), Dynamic Decisioning Solution (DDS), ICOMS, Customer Management, Solutions etc.
- Revenue: ▲$ 2.951 billion (2015)
- Operating income: ▲$ 194.4 million (2015)
- Net income: ▲$ 169 million (2015)
- Total assets: ▼$ 2.358 billion (2015)
- Total equity: ▲$ 1.276 billion (2015)
- Number of employees: 130,001 (2015)
- Website: www.convergys.com

Convergys Corporation was a corporation based in Cincinnati, Ohio, that sold customer management and information management products, primarily to large corporations. Customer management products included agent assisted, self-service and care software tailored to the communications, financial services, technology, retail, healthcare and government markets. Information management provided convergent billing and business support system (BSS) products and services including revenue management, product and order management, and customer care management to telecom, utilities, and cable/satellite/broadband service providers. They had approximately 130,000 employees across 33 countries.

== History ==
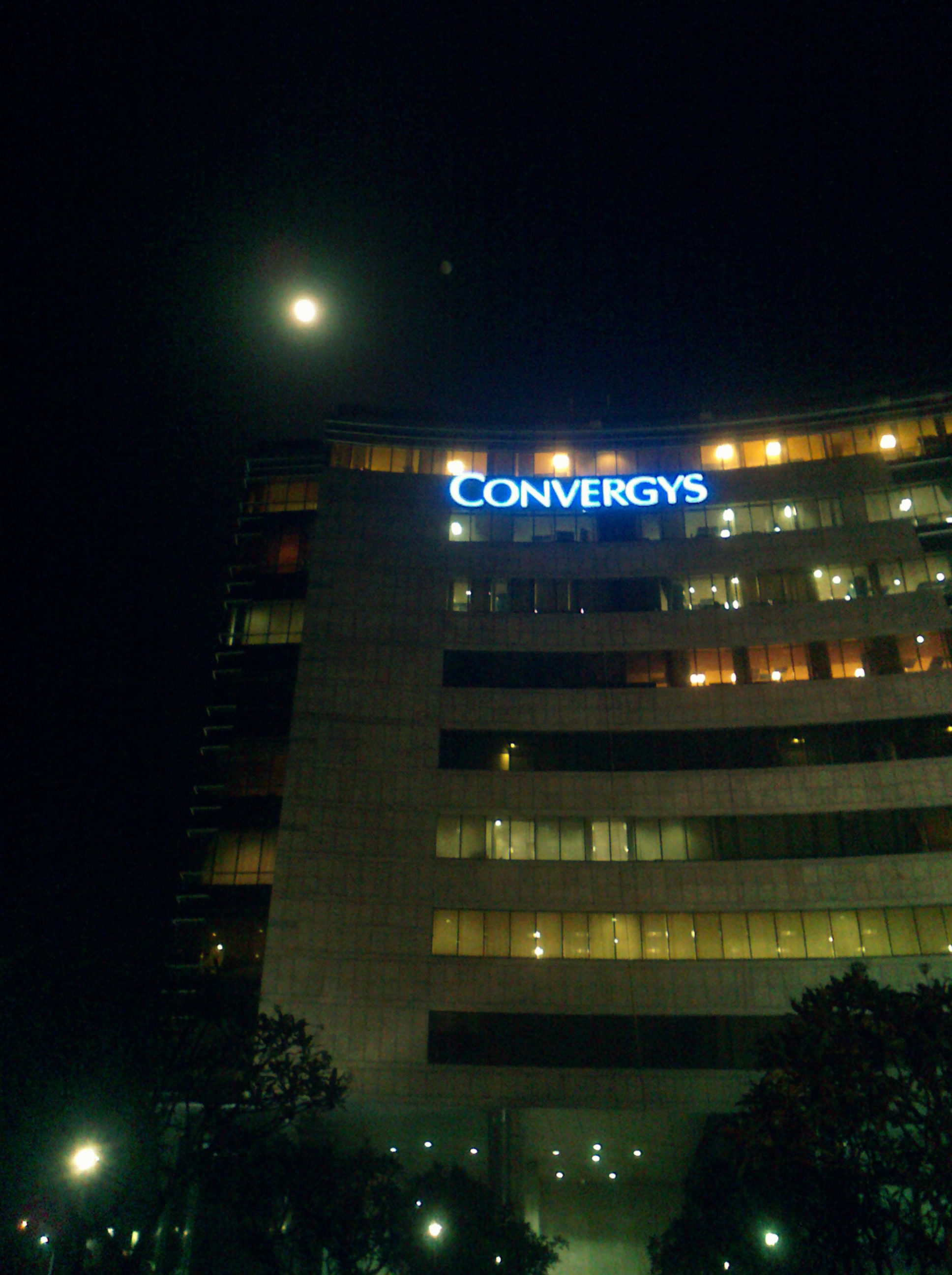
One of the Convergys offices in Gurgaon, India

The company grew from Cincinnati Bell Information Systems and MATRIXX, both subsidiaries of Cincinnati Bell, and AT&T Solutions Customer Care (formerly AT&T American Transtech), which was sold to Cincinnati Bell in 1998; an IPO in August 1998 made it a fully independent company. Since then, Convergys' headquarters in Cincinnati, Ohio, has acquired numerous companies.

On July 1, 2002, Convergys announced the purchase of the iBasis Speech Solutions line of business (formerly Price Interactive) from iBasis Inc. for $17 million in order to enhance its Interactive Voice Response (IVR) and Advanced Speech Recognition (ASR) solutions.

In 2003, Convergys opened two call centres in the Philippines. The Philippines, along with India, was chosen by then president of the company, Jack Freker, for the company’s global expansion.

In 2004, Convergys bought DigitalThink for $120 million. DigitalThink helped Convergys expand its human resources outsourcing business.

On November 4, 2004 Convergys announced it had acquired Finali, a Westminster, Colorado based company, for $25 million in cash. Finali provided integrated customer support and sales support management services for e-commerce sites.

Convergys acquired Intervoice, a Dallas-based telecommunications company, in 2008 for $335 million.

Convergys sold its Human Resources Management line of business to NorthgateArinso in March 2010.

On March 22, 2012, Japanese technology firm NEC announced it would buy the Information Management Business of Convergys for approximately $449 million. In 2012, Convergys Philippines, 8 years after its entry into the country established 18 centers with 26,000 employees in all, was named “BPO Employer of the Year” at the annual International ICT Awards.

On April 3, 2013, Convergys completed the acquisition of New Zealand-based Datacom call center operations in Kuala Lumpur and Manila for $20 million.

On January 6, 2015, Convergys and Stream Global Services announced entry into a definitive merger. Under the agreement, Convergys would acquire Stream for a total enterprise value of $820 million in cash. On March 3, 2014, Convergys completed the acquisition of Stream creating the 2nd largest BPO provider in the outsourcing industry. The merger brought their total employees to approximately 125,000 with 150 centers in 31 countries supporting 47 languages.

In August 2016, Convergys acquired the buw Holding group.

== Synnex acquisition ==
On June 28, 2018, Convergys and Synnex announced they had reached a definitive agreement in which Synnex would acquire Convergys for $2.43 billion in combined stock and cash, and integrate it with Concentrix.

On October 5, 2018, Convergys and Synnex announced that they had completed the merger.
