= EPlus =

American information technology company

ePlus Inc.
- Type: Public
- Traded as: Nasdaq: PLUS; S&P 600 Component
- Industry: IT Solutions and Services
- Founded: 1990; 36 years ago
- Headquarters: Herndon, Virginia, US
- Area served: United States; United Kingdom; India; Singapore; Netherlands; Israel
- Key people: Mark Marron (CEO); Darren Raiguel (COO); Elaine Marion (CFO)
- Revenue: $2.23 billion (As of 2024)
- Number of employees: 2,199
- Website: eplus.com

ePlus Inc. (Nasdaq: PLUS) is an American consultative technology solutions provider that managed services across the technology spectrum, including security, cloud, networking, collaboration, artificial intelligence, and emerging solutions to more than 5,000 customers.

ePlus was founded in 1990, and was formerly known as MLC Holdings, Inc. The company changed its name to ePlus, inc. in 1999, after its IPO in 1996.

== Partnerships ==
ePlus offers technology solutions through partnerships with various technology vendors in areas such as security, cloud, networking, artificial intelligence, and digital infrastructure including Cisco Systems, Hewlett Packard, Apple Inc., Dell and Microsoft.

== Facilities and staff ==
ePlus’ operations are directed from its headquarters in Herndon, Virginia. The company has over 2,100 employees working in 30+ locations across the U.S., U.K., Europe, India and Singapore.

== Acquisition history ==
Since its IPO, ePlus has acquired 27 businesses within the United States. Currently, it has three operating subsidiaries which are combined into two business segments:

- The Technology Sales Business Unit – ePlus Technology, inc., which is the IT sales and services company, combined with ePlus Systems, inc., the software company.
- The Financing Business Unit – ePlus Group, Inc., which is the leasing and business process outsourcing company; ePlus Group was sold to the Marlin Leasing Corporation (PEAC Solutions), a portfolio company of HPS Investment Partners, LLC, on June 30, 2025.
