= Sovereign Group =

Corporate services company

- Type: Private company
- Industry: Trust law
- Founded: 1987
- Headquarters: Sovereign Place, 117 Main Street, Gibraltar
- Area served: British Virgin Islands, Cyprus, Dubai, Gibraltar, Guernsey, Hong Kong, Isle of Man, Malta, Mauritius, Portugal, Saudi Arabia, Shanghai, Singapore, South Africa, Switzerland, Turks and Caicos Islands, United Kingdom,
- Key people: Howard Bilton, Chairman, Gerry Kelly, Group CEO
- Services: Asset management, financing, tax, credit cards, Retirement Planning
- Website: SovereignGroup.com

Sovereign Group is a Gibraltar-based corporate services company established in 1987. Sovereign's core business is setting up and managing tax-efficient structures to assist wealth management, foreign property ownership and cross-border business. The Sovereign Group has offices or agents in most major offshore and onshore financial centres worldwide.

The company mostly provides fiduciary services to high-net-worth individuals and their families, Sovereign's clients include expatriates, entrepreneurs and businesses of all sizes. Sovereign also offers a wide range of services that are natural adjuncts to their main activity, including retirement planning, asset management, financing, specialist tax advice and credit cards.

Howard Bilton, a tax lawyer, is the chairman of the Sovereign Group. Bilton was responsible for setting up the Sovereign Art Foundation which runs both the Sovereign Asian and European Art Prize, turning his art-collecting hobby into what is now Asia's largest art prize.
