= Buw Holding =

Company

buw Holding GmbH
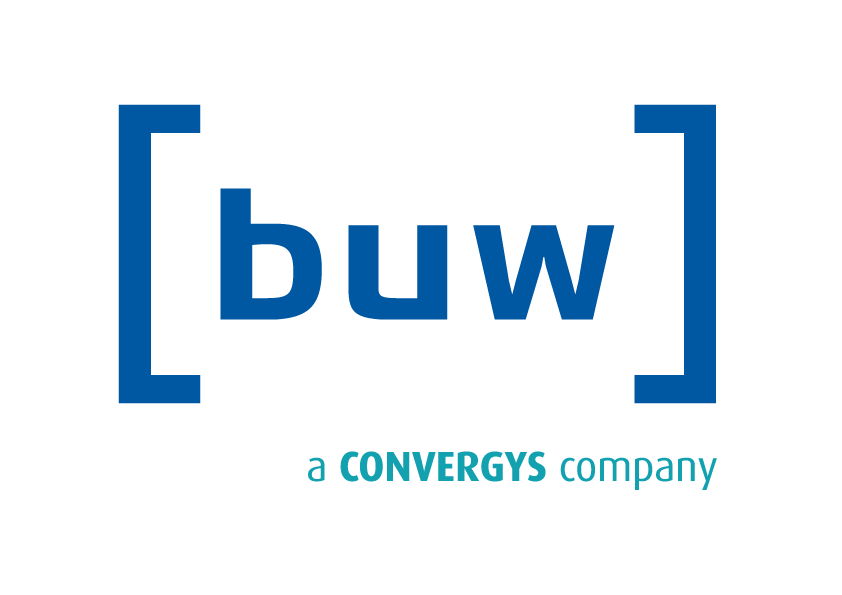
- Company type: GmbH
- Industry: Business process outsourcing
- Founded: 1993
- Founder: Karsten Wulf; Jens Bormann
- Headquarters: Osnabrück, Lower Saxony, Germany
- Key people: Karsten Wulf; Jens Bormann
- Number of employees: 4,000 (March 2011)
- Website: www.buw.de

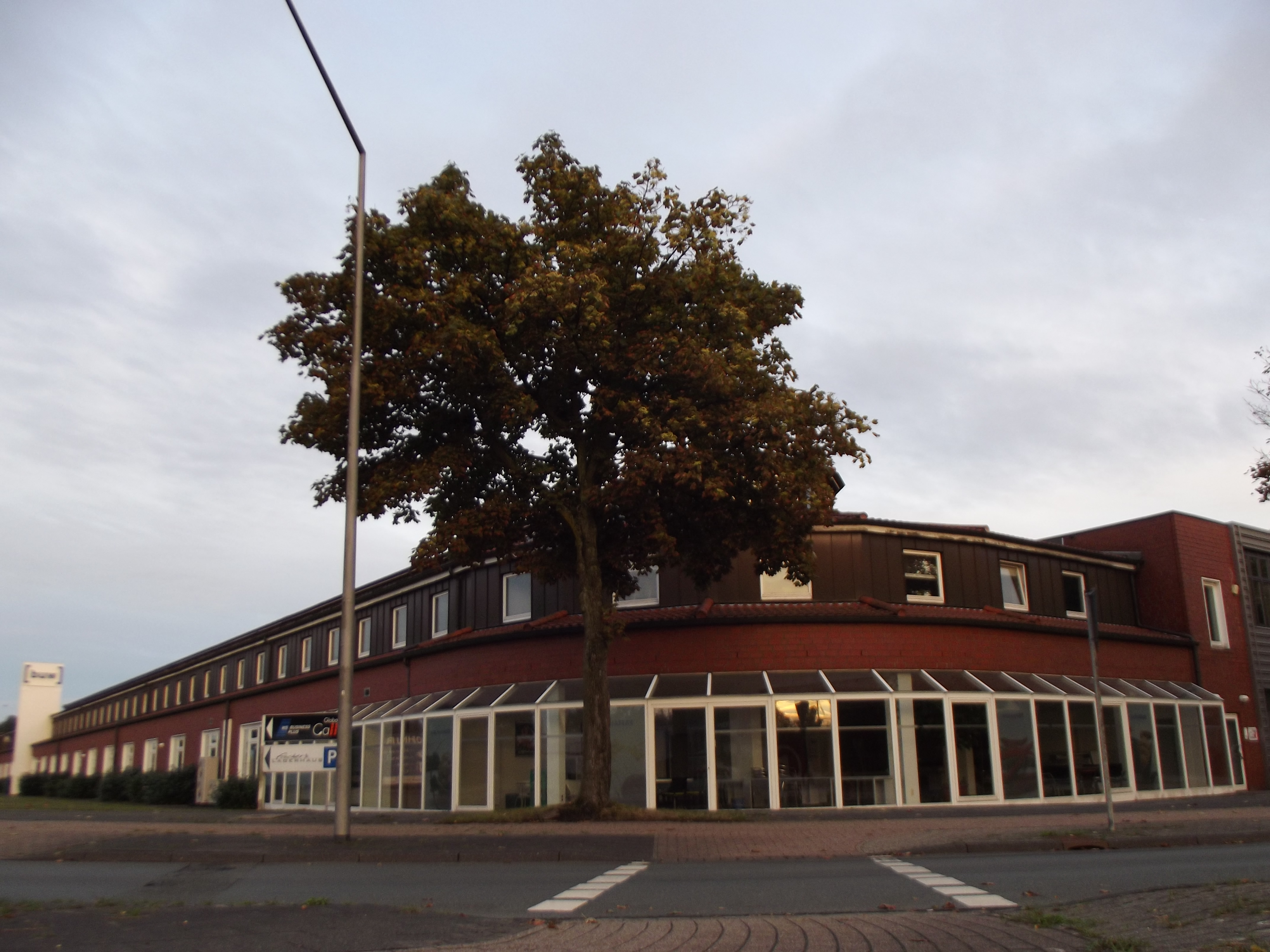
buw callcentre in Münster

The buw Holding GmbH was an owner-run German company based in Osnabrück acquired by Convergys through a definitive merger. It is especially known for its call centres and has altogether about 6,000 employees who work in Osnabrück, Münster, Halle, Schwerin, Berlin, Leipzig, and Wismar in Germany, Pécs in Hungary, and Timișoara and Cluj in Romania.

== History ==
Jens Bormann and Karsten Wulf, who met at the University of Osnabrück, founded their company in March 1993 as b u. w (Bormann und Wulf) Telefonmarketing GmbH while they still were students. In 2001 the company was restructured. In 2002, employees founded the organisation Lernen fürs Leben ("Learning for Life") which is committed to projects in the Third World, in particular if they serve the purpose to teach people how to make a living on their own.

In 2006, the company received the European Call Centre Award for its corporate identity.

In August 2016, Convergys Corporation completed its acquisition of buw.

== Structure ==
The buw Holding GmbH consists of two main branches:

- buw customer care operations
  (That's the part of the company running the call centres. It includes buw customer care operations Osnabrück GmbH, buw customer care operations Münster GmbH, buw customer care operations Halle GmbH, buw customer care operations Leipzig GmbH, buw customer care operations Schwerin GmbH, buw Hungary Kft. and buw Romania S.R.L.)
- buw consulting GmbH.

== Awards ==
- 2002: Entrepreneurs des Jahres
- 2006: European Call Centre Award
- 2013: HR Excellence Award
- 2014: Deutscher Preis für Onlinekommunikation
