= Synnex =

American information technology company

SYNNEX Corporation
- Industry: IT services, IT consulting
- Founded: 1980; 46 years ago
- Founders: Robert T. Huang
- Defunct: September 1, 2021
- Fate: Merged with Tech Data
- Successor: TD Synnex
- Headquarters: Fremont, California, U.S.
- Key people: Dennis Polk (President & CEO)
- Products: IT systems; Data center servers & storage; Computer hardware; Computer software; Consumer electronics
- Services: Outsourcing; Managed services; IT Consulting; Systems integration; Supply chain management
- Revenue: ▲US$23.757 billion (2019)
- Operating income: ▲US$813 million (2019)
- Net income: ▲US$500 million (2019)
- Total assets: ▲US$11.697 billion (2019)
- Total equity: ▲US$3.788 billion (2019)
- Number of employees: 240,000 (2019)
- Website: synnexcorp.com

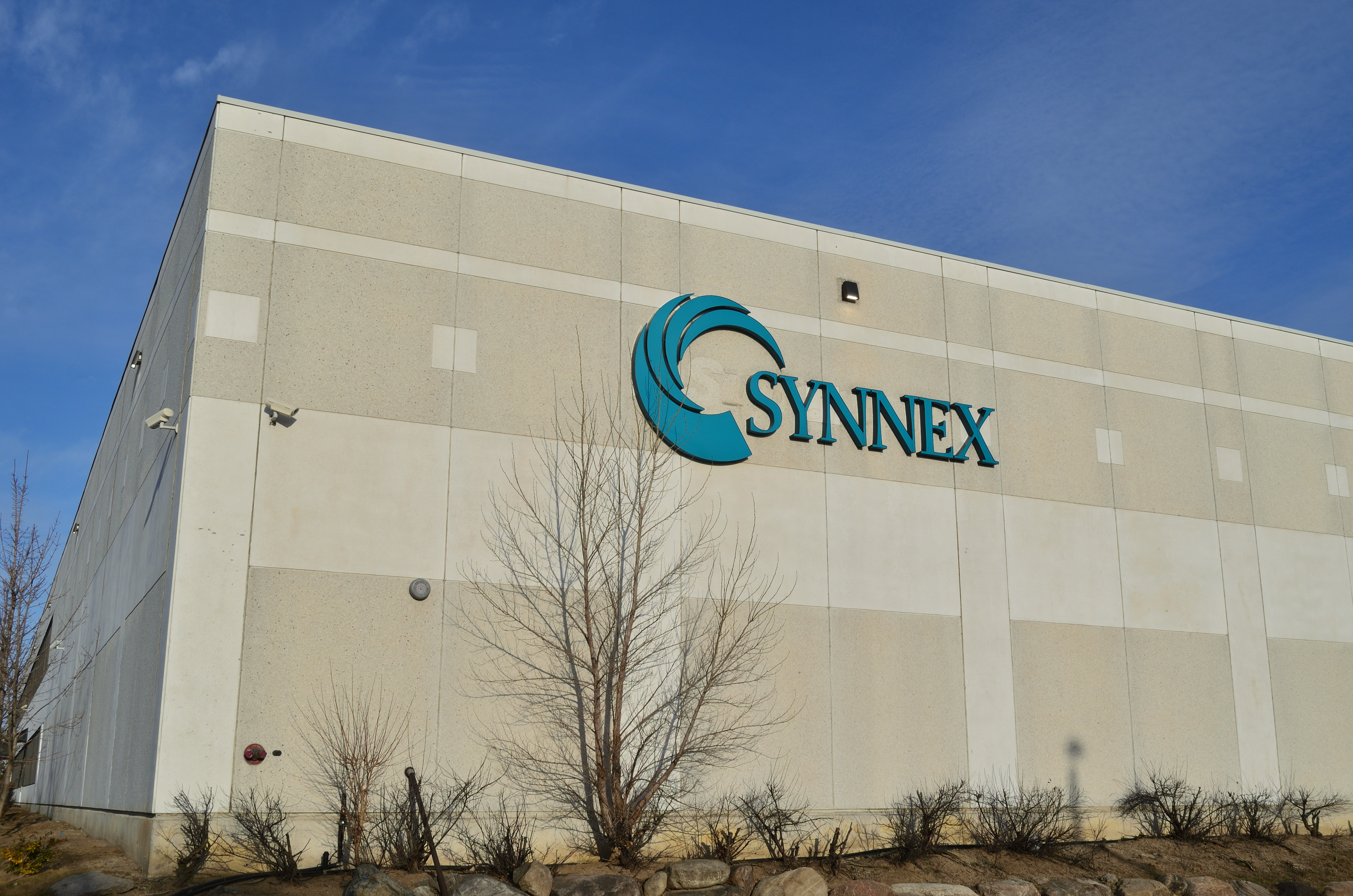
Synnex in Canada

Synnex was an American multinational corporation that provided information technology (IT) services to businesses. It merged with competitor Tech Data to form TD Synnex. It was founded in 1980 by Robert T. Huang and based in Fremont, California. As an information technology supply chain services company, it offered services to original equipment manufacturers, software publishers and reseller customers.

== History ==
Originally founded as a technology hardware distributor, Synnex distributes products and related logistics services. As a business process outsourcing and contract assembly it works with industry suppliers of IT systems, peripherals, system components, software and networking equipment. The company is one of the major employers in Greenville, South Carolina. On 21 December 2009, Synnex acquired Jack of All Games from Take-Two Interactive. In December 2010 Synnex acquired the managed business solutions division of e4e, an ITes service provider located in Bangalore in India.

In 2012 Hyve Solutions announced a partnership with IBM and Zettaset to produce a bundled "turnkey" platform for Hadoop-based analytics targeted to the needs of small- and medium-sized businesses. Synnex acquired IBM's worldwide customer care business process outsourcing (BPO) services business on 11 September 2013.

In June 2017, Synnex acquired the North and Latin American operations of Westcon-Comstor, along with 10% of the remaining part of Westcon (Westcon International) from Datatec for a reported $800 million.

On 28 June 2018, Convergys and Synnex announced they have reached a definitive agreement in which Synnex would acquire Convergys for $2.43 billion in combined stock and cash, and integrate it with Concentrix. On 5 October 2018, the merger was completed.

On 9 January 2020, Dennis Polk, President and Chief Executive Officer of Synnex, announced plans to separate SYNNEX and Concentrix into two publicly traded companies. The spinoff was completed on 1 December 2020, with Synnex shareholders getting one share of Concentrix for each share of Synnex they held.

In July 2021, the Republican National Convention's servers were hacked through Synnex. The company said it "could potentially be in connection" with the Kaseya VSA ransomware attack that unfolded days prior.

On 22 March 2021 it was announced that Synnex will merge with Tech Data for a sum of 7.2 billion USD, including debt. Synnex shareholders received 55% of the merged company.

=== Merger with Tech Data ===
On September 1, 2021, Synnex completed a merger with Tech Data. This merger created a new company with $59.8 billion in revenue, TD Synnex. Through the combination of both companies, TD Synnex becomes the largest IT distributor, surpassing Ingram Micro. TD Synnex is led by former Tech Data CEO, Rich Hume.
