= Tech Data =

U.S.-based technology company

Tech Data Corporation

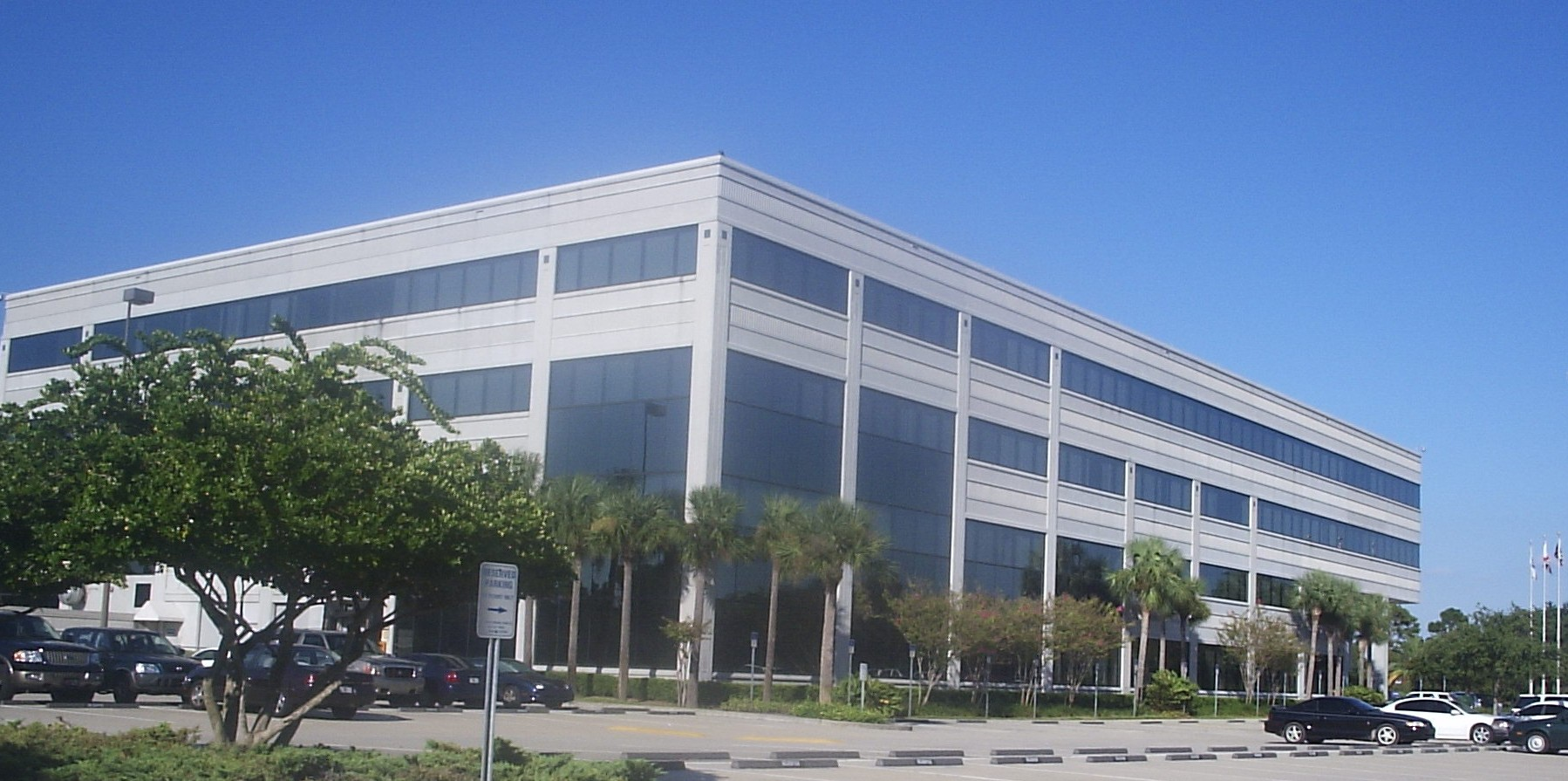
- Headquarters
- Type: Private
- Traded as: Nasdaq: TECD
- Industry: Distribution (business); Technology; Electronics; Computer hardware Computer software IT consulting Retail
- Founded: 1974; 52 years ago, in Clearwater, Florida, U.S.
- Founder: Edward C. Raymund
- Fate: Merged with Synnex
- Successor: TD Synnex
- Headquarters: 5350 Tech Data Drive, Clearwater, Florida, U.S.
- Area served: Worldwide
- Key people: Rich Hume (CEO); Charles V. Dannewitz (CFO)
- Revenue: ▲US$36.775 billion (2018)
- Operating income: ▲US$410 million (2018)
- Net income: ▼US$116 million (2018)
- Total assets: ▲US$12.653 billion (2018)
- Total equity: ▲US$2.921 billion (2018)
- Owner: Apollo Global Management
- Number of employees: ~14,000 (January 2018)
- Website: techdata.com

Tech Data Corporation was an American multinational distribution company specializing in IT products and services headquartered in Clearwater, Florida. It merged with competitor Synnex to form TD Synnex. Synnex is to be the primary owner (55% share). Tech Data provided a broad range of product lines, logistics capabilities and value-added services that enable technology manufacturers and resellers, such as Google, Apple, Cisco, Dell, Fortinet, Hewlett Packard Enterprise, HP Inc., IBM, Lenovo, LG, Microsoft, Sony, Trend Micro, Viewsonic, TP-Link and VMware, to deploy IT solutions.

Tech Data is now one of the world's largest distributors of IT products and services, generating $37.7 billion in net sales for the fiscal year ended January 31, 2017. The company ranked No. 83 on the 2018 Fortune 500 and one of Fortune's "World's Most Admired Companies."

== History ==
Founded in Clearwater, FL by Edward C. Raymund in November 1974, Tech Data Corporation marketed data processing supplies for mini and mainframe computers. In 1983, Tech Data began to transition from a reseller to full-line national distributor of personal computer products, a transition led by Steven A. Raymund, Edward's son.

Steve A. Raymund succeeded Edward C. Raymund as chief executive officer in 1986, the same year Tech Data announced its initial public stock offering on NASDAQ (ticker symbol: TECD).

Over the past 20 years, Tech Data expanded its business into Canada, Mexico and Europe by acquiring 18 companies. Some companies acquired included Canada-based ParityPlus, Paris-based Softmart International, Munich-based Computer 2000 AG, Globelle Canada, UK-based Azlan Group PLC, Actebis AG Switzerland, Nordics-based IT distributor Scribona, Netherlands-based Triade Holding B.V., Specialist Distribution Group (SDG), and Signature Technology Group (STG).

In 2013, Tech Data lost out on nearly 27 million euros in profit following an accounting error by their former financial comptroller.

In the second quarter of 2015, Tech Data posted record earnings, increasing net income by 22.4% and sales by 8%. Tech Data's data-center business is attributed with the record earnings.

In September 2016, Tech Data announced that it had entered into an agreement to acquire the Technology Solutions operating group from Avnet, Inc. in a stock and cash transaction valued at approximately US$2.6 billion. Under the terms of the agreement, Avnet received at closing approximately US$2.4 billion in cash and 2.785 million shares of Tech Data common stock, representing an approximate 7 percent ownership position in Tech Data. The acquisition was closed in February 2017.

ExitCertified is a wholly owned subsidiary of Tech Data Corporation with head offices in Canada (Ottawa) and the USA (Sacramento).

In November 2019, Tech Data announced that Apollo Global Management would acquire the company for approximately $6 billion. The deal was closed on June 30, 2020.

On March 22, 2021, it was announced that Synnex would acquire 55% of Tech Data for a sum of $7.2 billion including debt.

=== Merger with Synnex ===
On September 1, 2021, Tech Data completed a merger with Synnex. This merger created a new company with $59.8 billion in revenue, TD Synnex. Through the combination of both companies, TD Synnex becomes the largest IT distributor, surpassing Ingram Micro. As of Sep 1, 2024 Patrick Zammit is the new CEO in place of Rich Hume.

== See also ==
- Competitor Ingram Micro
- Competitor Arrow Electronics
- Competitor AVNET INC
