= DLT (department store) =

Shopping center in Saint Petersburg, Russia

Coordinates: 59.9381°N 30.3225°E

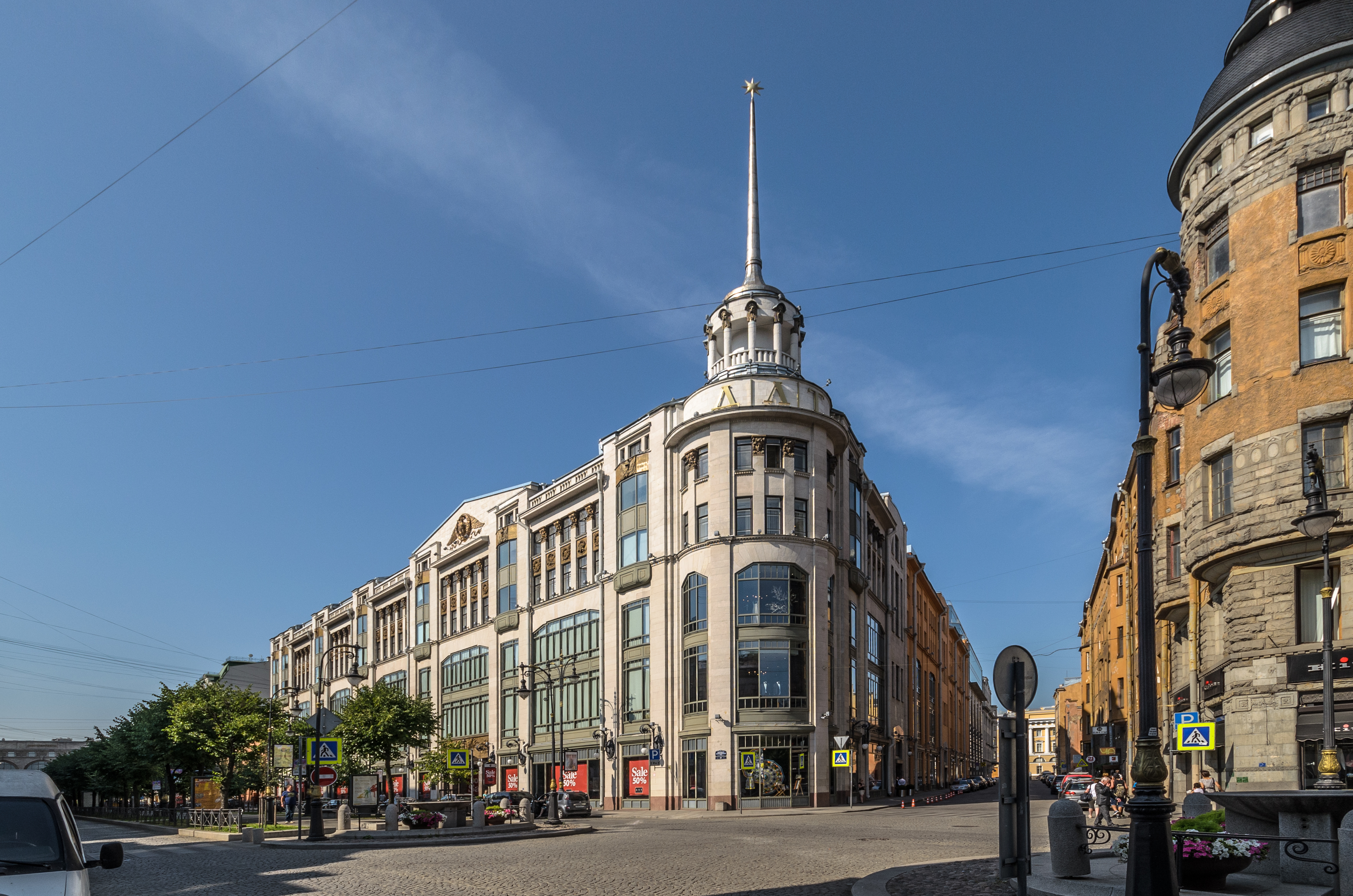
DLT in July 2014

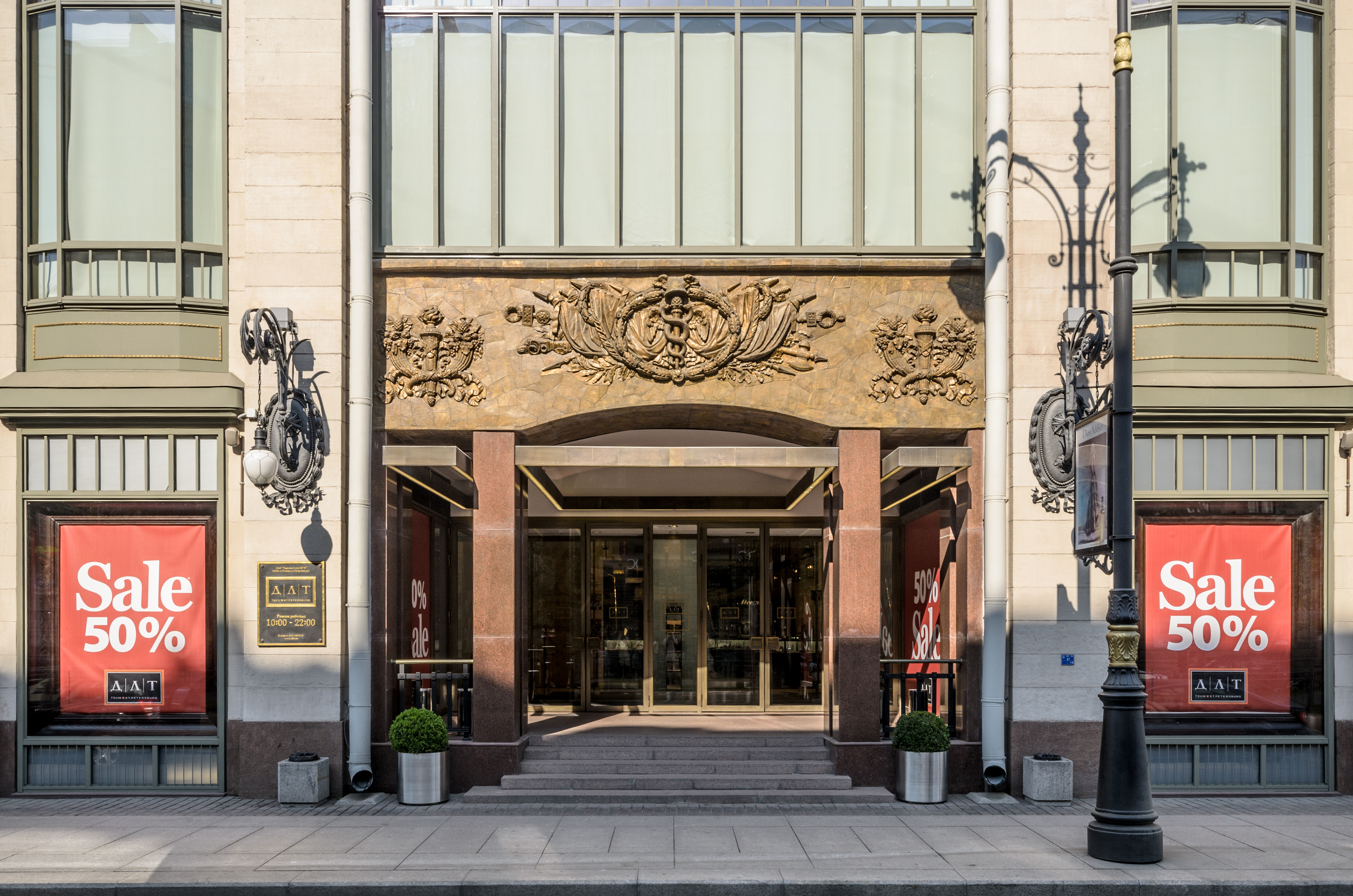
Entrance

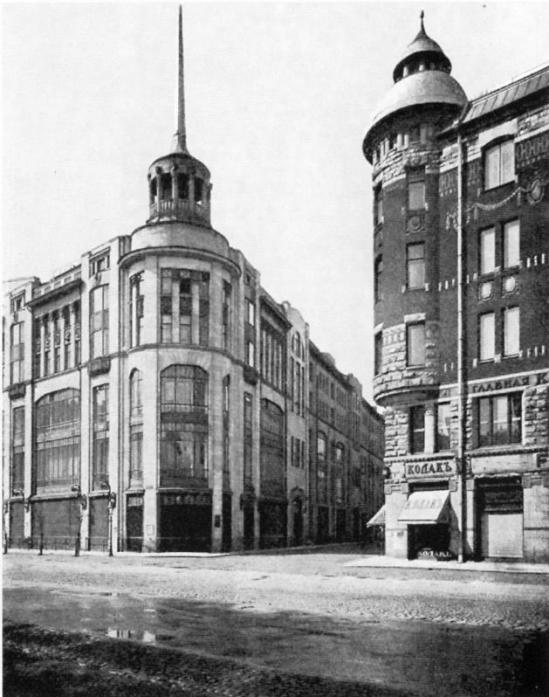
DLT in the 1910s

DLT (Russian:ДЛТ: Дом ленинградской торговли — Dom Leningradskoy Torgovli, "Leningrad Trade House") is a department store in Saint Petersburg, Russia, which reopened in 2012, after a major renovation, as a branch of the TsUM chain. DLT is located on Bolshaya Konyushennaya street 21–23 just north of Nevsky Prospekt.

== History ==
The land upon which DLT stands was originally developed in the 18th century and belonged to Artemy Volynsky, a major statesman Peter the Great's era. The Volynsky house occupied No. 21 and a small hotel, the "Volkovskie Nomera", occupied No. 23.

The present structure was purpose-built as a retail store for the officers of the garrison guard. At the time, officers were paid a high salary and were expected to live a lavish lifestyle. Along these lines, the officers' cooperative felt it appropriate that their store should be no less luxurious than the most fashionable Parisian department stores. An architectural competition was held, presided over by famed Austrian architect Otto Wagner, and the German firm Wayss & Freytag was selected to lead the construction. The first phase of the store opened in 1908 as the Dom Gvardeyskava ekonomicheskava obshchestva (Дом Гвардейскаго экономическаго общества), i.e. the "House of the (Garrison) Guard Economic Society", but acquired the nickname Gvardeyskaya Ekonomka (Гвардейская экономка), or "Guards' Discount Shop" due to the discounted prices. In 1912–1913 the second phase was opened.

In 1918 after the revolution, the store was reorganized into offices and the "First State Department Store" (Первый государственный универсальный магазин) . In 1927 this was transformed again into the "House of the Leningrad cooperation LSPO (Leningrad Council of Consumer Societies)" (Дом ленинградской кооперации ЛСПО (Ленинградского совета потребительских обществ)) although often it was called LSD .In the 1930s, it became the "Torgsin" department store, and in 1935 it acquired its present name.

In 2005 the state auctioned off rights to the building to the Mercury company, the leader of the Russian retail market for the sale of luxury goods. From 2005-2012 it underwent renovations in order to open as a branch of TsUm. The retail area was expanded from 9,000 to 18,000 m^{2} by adding two more floors. The store reopened in September 2012.
