= TD Synnex =

American IT distribution company

TD SYNNEX Corporation
- Type: Public
- Traded as: NYSE: SNX; S&P 400 component
- Industry: IT services, IT consulting
- Predecessors: Synnex; Tech Data
- Founded: September 1, 2021; 5 years ago
- Headquarters: Clearwater, Florida & Fremont, California, U.S.
- Key people: Patrick Zammit (CEO); Ann Vezina (chair)
- Products: IT systems; Data center servers & storage; Computer hardware; Computer software; Consumer electronics
- Services: Outsourcing; managed services; IT consulting; systems integration; supply chain management
- Revenue: ▲US$62.5 billion (2025)
- Operating income: ▲US$1.41 billion (2025)
- Net income: ▲US$828 million (2025)
- Total assets: ▲US$34.3 billion (2025)
- Total equity: ▲US$8.45 billion (2025)
- Number of employees: 24,000 (2025)
- Website: tdsynnex.com
- Footnotes; Financials as of November 30, 2025.

TD Synnex Corporation (stylized as TD SYNNEX) is an American IT distribution for 1,500 technology vendors. Headquartered in Fremont, California, the company has a workforce of 24,000 and 150,000 customers in over 100 countries. It was formed in 2021 by the merger of Synnex and Tech Data. TD SYNNEX is led by CEO Patrick Zammit.

== History ==
With the merger of Tech Data and Synnex, TD SYNNEX becomes the largest IT distributor having a combined revenue of $59.8 billion, which surpasses Ingram Micro, whose 2020 revenue was $49.1 billion.

In 2024, TD SYNNEX met its SBTi-validated 2030 climate targets for reducing Scope 1 and 2 greenhouse gas emissions, six years ahead of schedule.

In 2025, TD SYNNEX and Dell Technologies established artificial intelligence testing laboratories in Germany and France. The labs aim to help businesses build, test and scale AI solutions with Agentic RAG, an architecture that runs on Dell’s AI Factory with NVIDIA infrastructure.

In August 2025, TD SYNNEX signed a three-year Strategic Collaboration Agreement (SCA) with Amazon Web Services to further AI, cloud, and marketplace services across North America, Latin America, and the Caribbean. In October 2025, TD SYNNEX launched an apprenticeship program connecting university students studying artificial intelligence and machine learning with company engineers and mentors.

In late 2025, the company was among five distributors selected by Microsoft as part of Microsoft’s consolidation of its global distributor network from approximately 180 to 60 partners.TD SYNNEX extended its distribution relationships with several other technology vendors afterward, including Samsung Knox in 2025 and Cisco, Hewlett Packard Enterprise, and BCM One in 2026.

In 2026, TD SYNNEX partnered with Nebius to secure over 1,000 NVIDIA GPUs for AI workloads, a deal described as the first of its kind in the IT distribution industry.

Since launching in 2011, TD SYNNEX’s charitable foundation, Share the Magic, has distributed $16 million to four partner organizations: Make-A-Wish South Carolina, A Child's Haven, Clement's Kindness, and Pendleton Place. In 2026, the foundation launched its President's Choice Award to support The Meyer Center for Special Children.

== Leadership ==
Ann Vezina serves as TD SYNNEX's executive chair of the board of directors. In November 2023, Patrick Zammit was named chief operating officer, reporting to company CEO Rich Hume.

In June 2024, the company announced that Patrick Zammit would assume the CEO role effective September 1, replacing Rich Hume who will remain on the TD SYNNEX board of directors.

== Ownership ==
At closing former SYNNEX shareholders owned 55% of TD SYNNEX while Apollo Global Management, the previous owner of Tech Data, owned 45%.

== Acquisitions ==
In June 2017, TD SYNNEX purchased the American Operations of Westcon-Comstor, a cybersecurity, networking, and data center solutions distributor, for $800 million.

In July 2025, TD SYNNEX acquired software development company and cloud commerce platform provider Apptium to grow its cloud commerce platform and its as-a-service capabilities.

In October 2025, TD SYNNEX acquired Gateway Computer Corporation, Japanese IT solutions and services provider.

In January 2026, it was announced that TD SYNNEX had completed its acquisition of the AV, unified communications and gaming business divisions from Exclusive Networks Poland. Following the transaction, the AV and UC operations were integrated into TD SYNNEX’s Maverick division, while the gaming business was incorporated into its Peripherals unit.

== Digital platforms ==
TD SYNNEX operates several digital platforms to support partners and customers. These include Newsflash, a news and updates site covering company and partner‑related announcements, and Trusted Advisor, a resource hub that provides guidance, tools, and content focused on helping partners develop capabilities and engage customers across technology solutions.

StreamOne, TD SYNNEX’s digital business orchestration platform, is used by 30,000 global customers to manage cloud subscriptions, digital services, and marketplace transactions. In 2024, the company added new APIs, real-time reporting, and security capabilities, as well as white-label cloud storefronts for UK and Ireland customers to create their own branded cloud marketplaces.

TD SYNNEX launched its PartnerFirst Digital Partner Portal in 2025. This platform consolidates the search, ordering, and management of both hardware and cloud products into a single interface, including traditional orders, subscriptions, and mixed-cart purchases.
