= CloudShare =

American cloud computing provider

- Company type: Private
- Founded: Tel Aviv, Israel, 2007
- Headquarters: San Francisco, California, USA
- Key people: Zvi Guterman (CEO)
- Products: CloudShare Enterprise
- Website: CloudShare.com

CloudShare (formerly IT Structures) is a cloud computing provider founded in 2007 in Israel. It is now headquartered in San Francisco, California.

== Services ==
CloudShare combines aspects of virtualization, cloud computing and advanced features to offer software as a service (Saas). Similar to virtual lab automation, CloudShare makes full-featured virtual enterprise environments available online and on-demand. This has applications including developing and testing, pre-sales demos, proofs-of-concept, evaluations, technical training, development and certification of hardware or software and channel enablement.

Customers can create multi-machine IT environments in the cloud or upload existing virtual machines. CloudShare supports hypervisors (VMWare, Oracle VirtualBox) and operating systems (Windows 7, Ubuntu), and provides templates for new machines with operating systems and even software (such as Microsoft SharePoint 2010, Microsoft Office 2010 or Ruby on Rails) preinstalled.

Created environments can consist of a single virtual machine or multiple networked machines and are able to operate seamlessly with the user’s physical PC or workstation. These environments can then be saved, replicated and shared with additional users who are free to interact with their own independent replica (or “snapshot”).

- CloudShare Enterprise is designed for enterprise-grade applications such as development and testing, virtual training, presales demos, proof of concepts, technical evaluations, and other IT functions. More robust and offering greater compute power and storage, as well as unlimited machines and sharing, CloudShare Enterprise also includes:
  - a user management dashboard with analytics tools
  - multiple user hierarchies, roles and privileges
  - customer branding
  - user-interface customization
  - integration with Salesforce.com

== History ==
CloudShare was founded in Tel Aviv, Israel in January 2007 by Avner Rosenan, Ophir Kra-Oz and Zvi Guterman, The company was originally named IT Structures. In 2009, CloudShare moved its headquarters to San Mateo, California. In December 2009, CloudShare closed its series B round of funding, receiving $10 million from Sequoia Capital, Charles River Ventures, and Gemini Capital, bringing total venture capital funding to $16 million. In 2014, Zvi Guterman bought the company back from Sequoia Capital and took it private.
