= Tracy Chou (software engineer) =

American software engineer

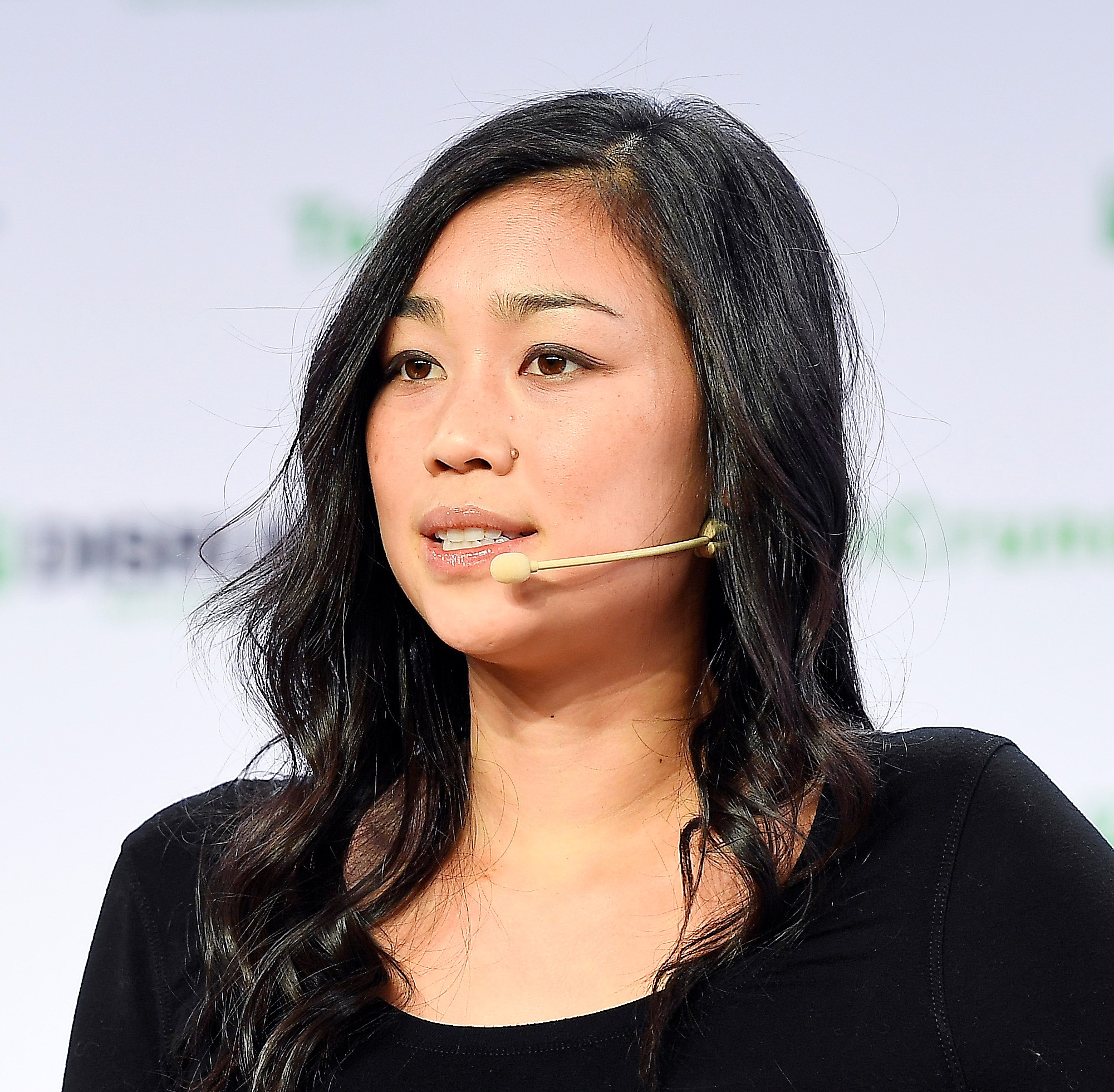
- Chou in 2019
- Born: 1987 (age 38–39); United States
- Education: Stanford University (BS, MS)
- Occupation: Software engineer

Tracy Chou (born 1987) is an American software engineer and advocate for diversity in technology related fields. She previously worked at Pinterest and Quora with internship experience at Google and Facebook.

She is best known for raising the profile of the issue of the low representation of women in technology companies, and pressuring companies to reveal more statistics about the composition of their workforce. In 2016, she co-founded the advocacy group Project Include with seven other women from the industry. In 2018, she founded Block Party, a startup company aimed at helping users optimize their privacy and security settings on social media. In 2022, she was named one of Time's 12 Women of the Year.

== Early life and education ==
Chou is a daughter of Taiwanese computer scientists based in Silicon Valley who immigrated from Taiwan. She attended St. Francis High School in Mountain View.

Chou studied electrical engineering (B.S.) as well as computer science (M.S.) at Stanford University with a specialization in machine learning and artificial intelligence. During that time, she interned at Google and Facebook, and went on to receive a master's degree in computer science. Describing her undergraduate experience studying computer science, Chou said she felt, "really out of place" and less confident than her male colleagues at the beginning and took time to realize that she was outperforming most of them in coursework.

== Career ==
Though she was studying computer science and enjoyed programming, she did not seriously consider programming as a full-time job. Even after an internship as a programmer at Facebook, she was not considering becoming a software engineer and instead hoped to get her doctorate to do quantitative marketing research. However, in 2010, Quora, which was then a small startup, approached her and convinced her to start working as an engineer there. She joined Quora as the company's fourth employee, but left in October 2011 to join Pinterest, becoming one of the first 15 employees at the then-fledgling pinboard company.

In February 2015, Chou signed on as a consultant for the United States Digital Service, a consortium of technology practitioners trying to make government in the United States more efficient. In August 2015, TechCrunch reported that Chou was a featured maker at Makerbase, a service that "make[s] it easier for anyone to discover who built some of the most popular websites and apps people use every day."

In December 2018, Chou became the CEO and founder of Block Party, "a consumer app that tackles online harassment and puts you back in control." In 2022, the company pivoted to privacy after losing access to Twitter's API citing the acquisition of Twitter by Elon Musk.

== Activism ==
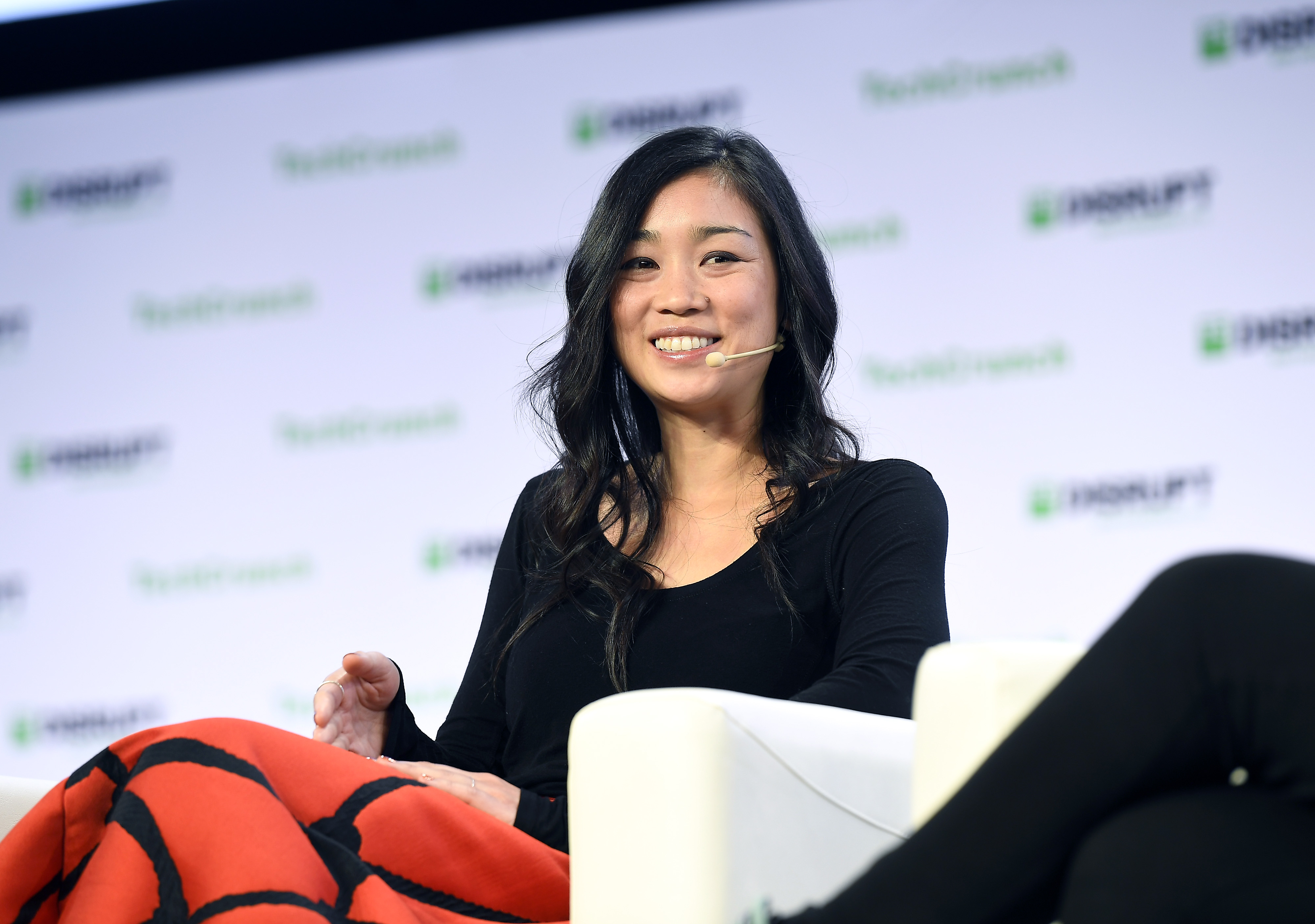
Chou at TechCrunch Disrupt San Francisco 2019

In October 2013, Chou attended the annual Grace Hopper Celebration of Women in Computing, where she became curious about the issue of female representation in technology companies, and decided to gather data to assess the severity of the issue. This led her to write a blog post urging technology companies to disclose the numbers of women they had in technical roles. To facilitate sharing of the responses she received, Chou set up a repository on code-sharing site GitHub which allows anyone to submit a pull request. Within a week, the repository had statistics on over 50 firms, and by January 2016, it had statistics on 250 firms. Chou's focus on the issue is also credited with pressuring larger companies such as Google, Facebook, and Microsoft to release diversity reports. In July 2014, Chou published an update on Pinterest's engineering blog describing the company's progress so far on diversity and inclusion.

Chou has identified a number of possible reasons for the disparity in the representation of women in technology. She has argued that if nobody suggests to a woman that a career as a software engineer is a realistic possibility, she is less likely to consider it. She also thinks that networking opportunities and role models are more limited for women and minorities. Chou has also stated that condescending attitudes toward women are pervasive in Silicon Valley. According to one of her examples, a man she met at a conference tried to repeatedly correct her about a Quora feature that had been built while she worked at the company. She has also commented that women who look very feminine are often ignored in technical settings.

In late July 2015, Pinterest launched a project to hire more women and minorities and announced its commitment to publicly disclose its progress toward these goals and any obstacles encountered. Chou's role in highlighting the issue has been credited as a reason for the initiative. The initiative received praise from Jesse Jackson. In August 2015, Chou participated in the Twitter hashtag campaign #ILookLikeAnEngineer, started by Isis Anchalee from OneLogin and intended to show that people (particularly women) of a wide range of appearances could be engineers. Chou's participation was noted in the New York Times. May 2016 saw the launch of the diversity consulting group Project Include, founded by Chou, Erica Baker, Freada Kapor Klein, Ellen Pao and others. Its approach was quickly described as "taking a page out of open source software."

== Public appearances ==
In April 2018, Chou spoke at Stanford University's Entrepreneurial Thought Leaders Series. In June 2018, she spoke at Vogue Australia's new conference Vogue Codes in Sydney. Chou has also previously spoken at TechCrunch's Disrupt SF conference.
