= Sal Sferlazza =

American entrepreneur

Salvatore Sferlazza
- Education: SUNY Albany
- Occupation: CEO at NinjaOne
- Notable work: Lasso Logic, NinjaOne, PacketTrap

Sal Sferlazza is the co-founder and CEO of NinjaOne. He is also the co-founder of several previous companies including Lasso Logic, PacketTrap, Anchor Networks, Boostingo and Realm Interactive.

== History ==
Sferlazza graduated from the State University of New York at Albany in 1996 and while attending school he worked for his uncle in New York City as an IT consultant. After receiving his degree he went to work at Accenture as a software consultant before deciding to become a founder.

In 2001, Sferlazza founded Realm Interactive, the first of four startups sold, with current NinjaOne President, Chris Matarese. They were working on a game called Exarch, a follow up to the popular game Trade Wars when the company was sold in 2004 to NCSoft. Sal had hired Marvel comic book artist Joe Madureira to do the artwork and the game was later released as Dungeon Runners.

=== Lasso Logic ===
In 2005, he co-founded Lasso Logic, a company that pioneered continuous data protection and redundant off-site data backups. The firm was sold to SonicWall in 2005 for approximately $20 million and became known as their Business Continuity Unit.

=== PacketTrap ===
Sferlazza co-founded the IT network management company PacketTrap and sold the company to Quest Software.

After PacketTraps, Sferlazza founded cloud managed service provider Anchor Networks which, was sold to EFolder in 2013.

=== NinjaOne ===
In 2013, Sferlazza and Matarese started NinjaRMM, originally based out of San Francisco, the company would rebrand as NinjaOne and relocate to Austin, Texas in 2021. NinjaOne raised a $30M round from Summit Partners and a $231M round valuing the company at $1.9 billion, led by ICONIQ in 2024.
