= Isis Anchalee =

Canadian full-stack engineer

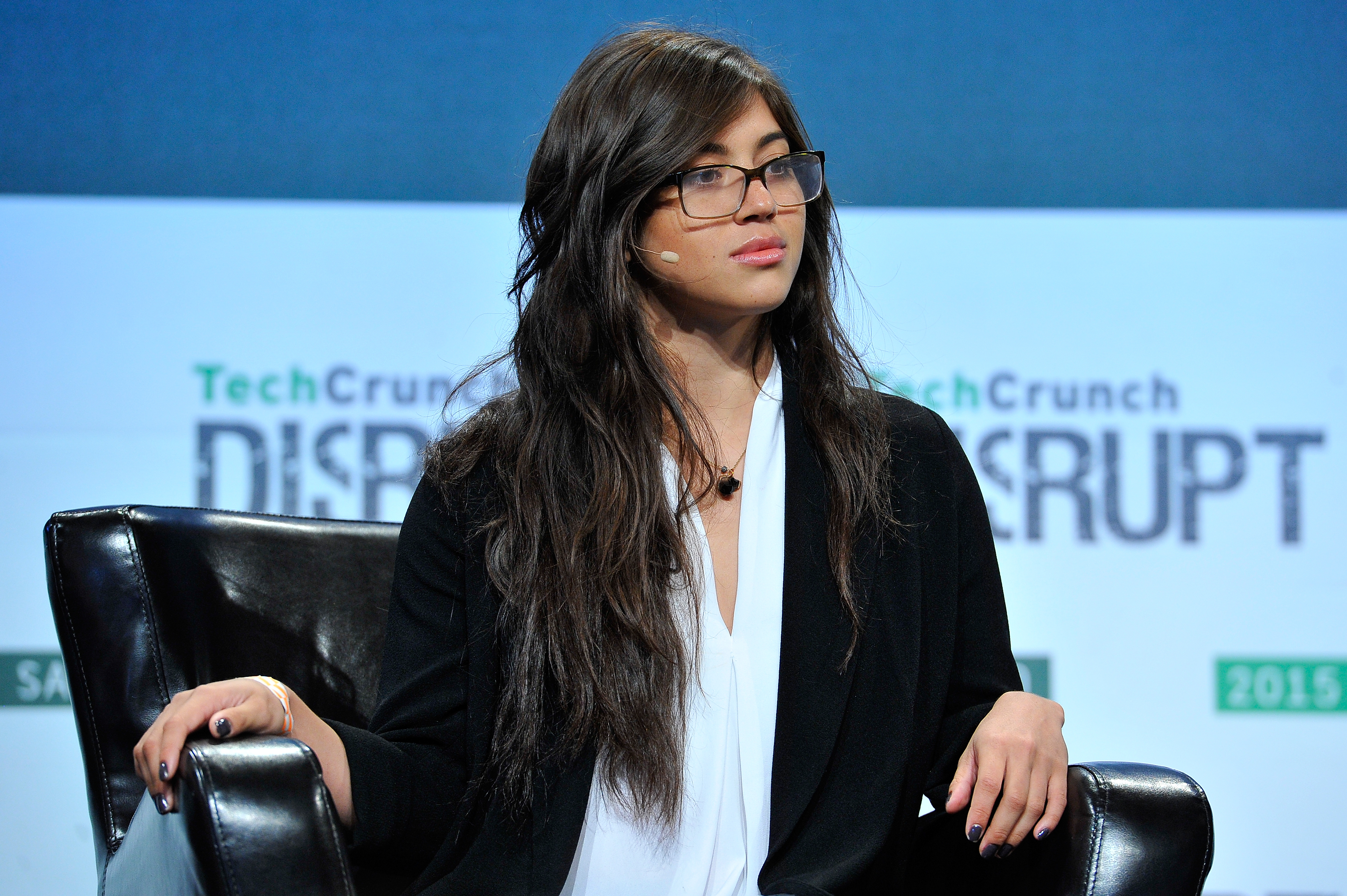
- Isis Anchalee during TechCrunch Disrupt SF 2015
- Born: 1993 (age 32–33)
- Occupation: Software Engineer
- Known for: ILookLikeAnEngineer

Isis Anchalee was born in Canada and is a full-stack engineer.

== Biography ==
Anchalee was born in 1993, and began teaching herself how to code in 2013. She was employed by OneLogin, Uber, and later Hustle, where she worked as a software engineer on its product team. She is also the founder of the #ilooklikeanengineer hashtag created in order to promote discussion of gender equality in tech after the OneLogin featured her face in an ad campaign. She has also given multiple talks, such as at Tech Inclusion New York in 2017 and at GHC15 in 2015. Anchalee is also on the Advisory Board of Women Who Code. Following being let go from Hustle, she started traveling the world and currently writes the blog Making Love With Life.

== Creation of I Look Like An Engineer ==
=== Hashtag ===
Anchalee created #ilooklikeanengineer (an example of hashtag activism) when she received derogatory comments about her face being featured in an ad campaign for OneLogin. Anchalee feels that most people are "...well intentioned but genuinely blind to a lot of [things] that those who do not identify as male have to deal with." The hashtag took off. In the first two months of it was used in 19,354 original tweets and 29,529 retweets One year after the launch of #ilooklikeanengineer 250,000 plus people had used the hashtag. Both her hashtag and the accompanying Medium post about her experiences received a lot of media coverage and her work was highlighted by celebrities such as Chelsea Clinton and Emma Watson. Her hashtag has been adapted for use in other professions not usually thought of as diverse (such as #ilooklikeasurgeon) and along with other organizations, such as Girls Who Code and Women Who Code, has led to more societal awareness of the diversity in the field of computing.

== Facebook ==
Her Facebook account was suspended due to similarities between her given name and the terrorist group ISIS, but her account was later reactivated.
