= Broadbus =

Broadbus Technologies Inc. was a Boxborough, Massachusetts-based, video-on-demand technology company. It was co-founded in 1999 by entrepreneurs Jeffrey Binder and Robert Scheffler. The company was acquired by Motorola in 2006.

== Funding ==
As a start-up, Broadbus raised $13 million in 18 months from Battery Ventures and Charles River Ventures of Waltham, Massachusetts. Also backed by Comcast Interactive Capital, Broadbus raised another $25 million in late 2003, and ultimately raised approximately $57 million in venture capital before the acquisition.

Broadbus was an early developer of memory-based systems for delivering both movies and television on demand. The company's flagship B-1 system was reportedly capable of supporting more than 15,000 subscribers simultaneously watching movies and television, all with fast-forward, rewind and pause controls. In 2003 the company received the trademark TOD, for "television on demand" services. By late 2004 employed more than 125 people throughout the US, Europe and Asia.

By the end of 2005, Broadbus was the market leader in VOD in Europe winning the whole of UPC, the continent's largest MSO, with over 16 million subscribers. In addition, Broadbus was fast becoming number one for new VOD streams sold worldwide, approaching SeaChange and Concurrent, the prior market leaders. They were purchased by Motorola in September 2006 for $181 million.
