= Tracy Chou =

Tracy Chou, may refer to:

- Tracy Chou (software engineer), American software engineer
- Tracy Chou (actress), Taiwanese actress
