= HostPapa =

Canadian web hosting company

- Type: Private company
- Industry: Web hosting, SSL certificates, small businesses, Information Technology
- Founded: 2006
- Founder: Jamie Opalchuk
- Headquarters: Burlington, Ontario, Canada
- Website: hostpapa.com

HostPapa is a Canadian-based privately owned web hosting company that provides shared, reseller, and virtual private server (VPS) hosting. It operates in Canada, United States, United Kingdom, Australia, Germany, New Zealand, Mexico, Singapore, India, Hong Kong, European Union, France, Ireland, Belgium and Spain. In 2023, the company provided hosting services to more than 500,000 websites.

== History ==
HostPapa entered the dedicated and hosted applications' market in 2002, and began offering web hosting services to customers in 2005, through its first registered domain.

It was officially founded in Canada by Jamie Opalchuk in 2006. In 2010, HostPapa was accredited by the Better Business Bureau.

The previous company logo, including the "Papa" character, was the result of a 2012 "Who's Your Papa?" logo design contest. The current logo was designed and launched in 2022.

In June 2012, HostPapa partnered with Cloudflare, a website performance optimization company. Also in 2012, HostPapa announced a partnership with SiteLock Website Security.

HostPapa appeared on the PROFIT 500 ranking of Canada’s fastest-growing companies based on five-year revenue growth for 5 consecutive years, from 2013-2017. On February 9, 2015, Dropmysite announced multi-language partnership with HostPapa.

HostPapa has received several awards since the company was founded, including Uptime Awards from NCM Online and WHTop. In 2021 and 2022, HostPapa placed #329 and #348, respectively, on Globe and Mail’s list of Canada’s top growing companies.

=== Acquisitions ===
- In 2020, HostPapa purchased 9 other hosting companies, including Korax, Lunarpages, PacificHost, Santa Barbara Hosting and Canvas Host.
- In 2020, they purchased Data Deposit Box, a provider of cloud backup and recovery technology.
- In April 2021, they purchased Silicon Valley Web Hosting from Denetron LLC.
- In June 2021, HostPapa acquired the web hosting companies LFC Hosting and iHost.
- In July 2021, HostPapa acquired UptimeMate, keeping it as a standalone solution while also intending to offer it as a part of their PapaCare+ plan.
- In January 2022, HostPapa acquired web hosting provider Osiris Communications.
- In February 2022, HostPapa acquired web hosting provider WooCart.
- In March 2022, HostPapa acquired the Californian company, Cloud 9 Hosting.
- In January 2023, HostPapa acquired the web hosting and logo design operations from Deluxe Corporation for an undisclosed sum. This acquisition includes ColoCrossing's flagship BUF1 data center in Buffalo, New York.
- In June 2025, HostPapa Signed a definitive agreement to acquire the CloudBlue business from Ingram Micro for an undisclosed amount. This acquisition was completed in August 2025 and new executive appointments were announced.

== Infrastructure ==
HostPapa has web hosting infrastructure, including Hewlett-Packard hardware and servers, networked by Cisco equipment, in various tier one data centers in Canada and around the world. The company operates North American-based call centers for customer support in English, French, German, and Spanish. Its hosting services use Sucuri server software and CloudProxy.

The company uses MailChannels SMTP relay anti-spam technology to analyze outbound email behaviour in order to limit unwanted emails and ensure email delivery to its customers. Customers use cPanel control panel to access HostPapa's web hosting software.

In July 2017 CEO Jamie Opalchuk said the company plans to broaden its data center coverage with servers in the United States, United Kingdom, and Australia. In 2020, the company launched two new data centers, in Amsterdam and California respectively.

== Services ==
HostPapa offers several shared website hosting plans which provide unlimited domains and subdomains, with 500 to 1000MB limited individual email, MySQL, cPanel access, and private name services. They also offer VPS hosting, reseller hosting, and Managed WordPress hosting.

== Incidents ==
On May 7, 2015, Fergal Gallagher from Tech Times reported a worldwide hacking issue that endangered millions of websites. WordPress software (content management system) vulnerabilities could have allowed hackers to gain control of websites using the default theme and plug-in if the website owner or administrator clicked on a malicious link. At the time of publication, major web hosts, including HostPapa, had already fixed the vulnerability.

== Philanthropy ==
In 2011, through the Love Trees charity, HostPapa donated 10,000 trees in Africa for Earth Day. HostPapa was given the Love Trees Partnership award of Merit. That year, HostPapa held a promotion in which it donated $5 to Save the Elephants for every GoDaddy customer who transferred to HostPapa. In 2016, HostPapa began supporting Kiva.org, a microfinance crowdfunding platform.
