= Kimberly Bryant =

Kimberly Bryant may refer to:

- Kimberly Bryant (technologist) (born 1967), American electrical engineer
- Kimberly Bryant, castmember on season 1 of The Real Housewives of Orange County
