= One Identity =

American identity and access management company

- Type: Private
- Industry: Identity and Access Management (IAM)
- Founded: 2016; 10 years ago
- Headquarters: Aliso Viejo, California, United States
- Key people: Praerit Garg (CEO)

One Identity is a company that provides identity and access management products. One Identity’s main product is OneLogin, which allows businesses to securely manage user logins and access applications and systems.

One Identity operates as a part of the Quest Software and formerly was a part of SonicWall.

== History ==
In August 2016, Dell started selling its software group to private equity firms Francisco Partners and Elliott Management. As part of the sale, Quest Software and One Identity were separated from the American cybersecurity company SonicWall to operate as independent companies. On June 1, 2017, One Identity was announced as an independent brand.

In October 2018, One Identity was involved in discussions about cybersecurity measures during the U.S. midterm elections, focusing on securing electoral infrastructure against growing threats. This included concerns about foreign interference, disinformation, and system vulnerabilities, with efforts coordinated between agencies like Cybersecurity and Infrastructure Security Agency and private organizations.

In 2018, One Identity acquired Balabit, a Budapest-based company working in privileged access management with over one million corporate users worldwide.

On October 4, 2021, One Identity announced its acquisition of OneLogin, a provider of identity and access management software. In the same year VentureBeat reported that a 2021 study by One Identity found that 95% of organizations struggle to manage the increasing sprawl of digital identities.

On March 13, 2024, One Identity announced a partnership with Verinext.
