= Geza Czige =

Hungarian-American businessman

- Born: 1947 (age 78–79); Hungary
- Other name: Geza Csige
- Occupations: Businessman, teacher
- Known for: Co-founder of Micro D (later Ingram Micro)
- Spouse: Lorraine Mecca

Geza Czige or Geza Csige (born 1947) is a Hungarian-American entrepreneur. With his wife Lorraine Mecca he co-founded Micro D, a computer products distributor that became Ingram Micro, one of the largest companies in the United States.

== Biography ==
Czige was born in Hungary in 1947. He and his wife Lorraine Mecca were both teachers. In 1979 the couple immigrated to Southern California and founded Micro D, a computer products wholesaler, in Fountain Valley, California. The company had $3.5 million in sales in its first year. It later moved to Santa Ana and had $114 million in sales in 1984, with Czige as chairman and Mecca as chief executive.

In 1985, after merger with First Software fell through, Micro D named Linwood Lacy chairman and chief executive in place of Czige and Mecca. In 1986 Ingram Industries bought the founders' shares and became the majority owner of Micro D. The couple left the company.
