= Native Girls Code =

Native Girls Code (NGC) is a Seattle-based program that focuses on providing computer coding skills with grounding in traditional Indigenous knowledge for Native American girls aged 12 to 18 through workshops, coaching, teaching and role modeling.

Native Girls Code is organized by the nonprofit organization Na'ah Illahee Fund (Mother Earth in Chinook Jargon), in partnership with the University of Washington Information School and the Washington NASA Space Consortium, as a way to support and perpetuate traditional knowledge, build leadership of women and encourage greater participation of Native American students in STEM fields.

The program was designed to give Native girls from tribes throughout the United States a place to develop a strong foundation in Native culture, Native science, and build the skills needed to use modern computer technologies, resulting in the creation of websites, online games and virtual worlds. For example, NGC has organized workshops that combined traditional storytelling with robotics projects.

== Awards and grants ==
In 2016 NGC was awarded a grant through the City of Seattle's Technology Matching Fund, aimed at increasing digital equity among underrepresented Seattle citizens. Google has been a major funder of the program and Facebook has donated laptops and filming equipment to NGC.

In 2023, the Seattle Foundation awarded a grant to NGC through its Neighbor to Neighbor (N2N) program, which supported development of a digital kiosk about the history of the Daybreak Star Indian Cultural Center in Seattle.

== See also ==
- Girls Who Code
- Black Girls Code
- I Look Like an Engineer
