= I Look Like an Engineer =

Social campaign

The I Look Like an Engineer movement was created in August 2015 by software developer Isis Anchalee (formerly Isis Wenger) as a response to the backlash the OneLogin recruitment ad in which she was featured received. The movement aspired to break the stereotypes and promote diversity around underrepresented groups, particularly women, POC, and LGBTQ+ individuals in engineering fields. Its primary tactic is the use of the hashtag #ILookLikeAnEngineer on social media sites such as Twitter, Facebook, and Instagram, along with pictures of engineers or engineering students.

The I Look Like an Engineer movement has sparked other similar movements that also seek to break stereotypes in their industry, such as I Look Like a Surgeon, I Look Like a Professor and I Look Like a Civil Engineer.

== OneLogin campaign ==
In the summer of 2015 OneLogin, a software company, created a recruitment campaign aimed at attracting engineers to their home office in San Francisco, California. Four employees were invited to participate, including Anchalee. The ads were placed in the BART public transit stations and showed several OneLogin engineers sharing their experience working for the company. The ad featuring Anchalee went viral on several social media sites. A week after the launch of the campaign went viral, OneLogin posted an article on their blog that talked about the importance of diversity, inclusion, and innovation.

== Movement beginnings ==
The OneLogin recruitment ad featuring Isis Anchalee went viral as her particular ad received comments stating the belief that she was a model and not an actual engineer. Anchalee took to social media where she posted a picture of herself holding a piece of paper describing her job and a caption with the hashtag, #ILookLikeAnEngineer. In her post she stated her belief that it is important to raise awareness in tech diversity and break the stereotypes of what an engineer should look like.

Her post started the hashtag trend and the hashtag was used 86,000 times by August 7, 2015. The hashtag has been used in approximately 50 countries. The hashtag is mainly used by women and LGBTQ engineers. Subsequently, Anchalee put up a now-defunct webpage to establish a safe platform for individuals to share their experiences related to diversity issues within tech fields.

== Support ==
In an effort to make a lasting impact, Michelle Glauser (the spouse of Anchalee's co-worker) began a fundraising campaign using Indiegogo to create billboards with pictures that people had shared on social media using the hashtag #ILookLikeAnEngineer. The proceeds were used to put up more billboards to further the #ILookLikeAnEngineer campaign and excess proceeds were used to fund organizations that teach programming to minorities. The fundraiser’s goal was to raise $3,500. The campaigned ended on September 5, 2015 with $47,285 raised.

Concurrently, an #ILookLikeAnEngineer community gathering organized by Glauser through Eventbrite as part of efforts to continue further the movement was hosted on August 13, 2015, in San Francisco. During the gathering, photographers collected portraits of willing participants for the billboards and as an effort to document the event. The event was sponsored by Segment, Rackspace, OneLogin, and Hackbright Academy. The event included networking, discussions and a Q&A panel which included Anchalee, Alicia Morga, Wayne Sutton, Erica Baker, Leslie Miley, and Dom DeGuzman.

== See also ==
- Girls Who Code
- Native Girls Code
- Black Girls Code
- Hashtag activism
- Slacktivism
- Online Social Movements
- Fourth-wave feminism
- Women in engineering
- Women in STEM fields
