= Ashley Gavin =

American comedian

- Born: November 17, 1987 (age 38)
- Education: Bryn Mawr College
- Partner: Jen Davis

Comedy career
- Years active: 2014–present
- Medium: Stand-up comedy; podcasting
- Website: www.ashleygavin.com

Ashley Gavin (born November 17, 1987) is an American comedian, writer, and podcast host. She has been featured on Netflix is a Joke, Hulu, Comedy Central, and is also known for her crowd work videos on TikTok and her podcast, We're Having Gay Sex. She also hosts the podcasts Chosen Family along with online creators Alayna Joy and Mak Ingemi and What's News With You with Josh Johnson.

== Early life and education ==
Ashley Gavin was born on November 17, 1987. Her father died of lung cancer when she was 11 years old. She began acting in a theater club at age 11 as well, and wanted to be a comedian from a young age. Although barely passing mathematics in high school and failing biology, Gavin went on to earn a bachelor's degree from the women's liberal arts college Bryn Mawr College from 2006 to 2010, with a major with honors in Computer Science and a minor in Philosophy, graduating Magna Cum Laude.

After graduating, Gavin moved to Boston to take a position in the Lincoln Laboratory national security research lab at MIT as a software engineer, where she worked for two years and made technical contributions to the Rapid Area Sensitive-Site Reconnaissance (RASR) Advanced Technology Demonstration. This led her to become a computer science educator, serving as the founding curriculum director of Girls Who Code for four years and as an adjunct faculty member at Wesleyan University. Gavin has described some overlap between her ability to teach code and her acting and standup, saying that "teaching is very much a performance", though she says of this period of her life: "I loved that work. It was creative and intellectually stimulating. But I felt empty inside." She later described comedy as the outlet that filled that void.

== Comedy career ==
Gavin had long been involved in acting and improv but had never tried standup, so decided to take a standup course with actor and comedian Veronica Mosey, partly because she "wanted a woman's perspective". Her first stand-up routine was at an open mic night at The Lantern Comedy Club in New York City. It went so well that she remembers thinking when it was finished, "Oh. This is what I should be doing." About why she decided to make a career change, she later said,

The primary reason I do stand up is because it fills the void inside of me that not everyone has. If you don’t have a giant gaping hole in your heart or soul, consider yourself lucky. But I do, and if I don’t do stand up it eats me from the inside.

In 2014 Gavin took leave from her job as a computer science educator to pursue a career as a standup comedian, working a freelance consulting job on the side and living with her mother to save money. Within a few years she had performed a sold-out show at the Times Square comedy club Carolines on Broadway.

From 2019 to 2020 Gavin did a steady standup comedy gig with Carnival Cruise Line and was their first openly gay comedian. She would perform every day, sometimes twice a day, for crowds of up to 500 people.

In 2023, Gavin came under fire after reportedly telling an audience member who had previously attempted suicide to "try harder to kill [her]self." In addition to career setbacks, the fallout from this incident caused flare-ups of Gavin's C-PTSD.

=== We're Having Gay Sex ===
During the pandemic, Gavin began a podcast and TikTok channel, motivated by the lack of queer dating resources online, saying:

I was getting out of my third long-term monogamous relationship in a row. I was like, 'obviously I'm not doing something right.' ... I've never really existed in a world where queer dating was normal. It's starting to be, which is really good. In my opinion, it's pretty great to be queer right now. So I had the idea of documenting my dating life and gathering these stories.

This led Gavin to create We're Having Gay Sex, a comedy podcast which features weekly interviews often focusing on queer dating and sex life. Her co-hosts on this podcast are often younger, New York City-local, queer comedians, such as Kate Sisk, Maddie Wiener, Kylie Vincent, and Gabriel Gara Lonning. Current co-hosts include Lizzy Cassidy and Ali Kolbert. Notable celebrity guests have included Chappell Roan, JoJo Siwa, Dodie, Gianmarco Soresi, Justin Tranter, Sasha Velour, and Monét X Change.

We're Having Gay Sex was listed as one of the best comedy podcasts of 2020 by Paste Magazine as well as one of the best LGBTQ+ podcasts of 2021 and 2023 by Women's Health, and one of the best queer podcasts by BuzzFeed.

=== Acting and screenplay writing ===
Gavin is the co-creator of Gay Girl Straight Girl (GGSG) with Lee Hurst, who she calls "my favorite straight girl", and in which Gavin also stars.

== Personal life ==
Gavin is a lesbian and resides in New York. She is a WNBA fan who gets season tickets to New York Liberty games.
