= Jeff Binder =

American entrepreneur

- Education: Harvard University
- Occupations: CEO, Layer3 TV
- Years active: 1987 - present
- Board member of: Layer3 TV; This Technology

Jeff Binder is an American entrepreneur and the builder of several startups in the technology, media, and telecommunications sectors. He is the former executive vice president of home and entertainment at T-Mobile after the company bought Layer3 TV, the company Binder co-founded and was the CEO of until the purchase for $325 million. Layer3's service and platform eventually became T-Mobile's "T-Vision" once its version was launched by the company. Jeff Binder was also the founding CEO of Broadbus Technologies and an early investor and chairman of This Technology, which were sold respectively to Motorola and Comcast. He is brothers with renowned television producer, Steven D. Binder.

== Early life ==
Binder began playing table tennis at 10, and was ranked in the national Top 5 during his teen years.

== Career ==
In the 1990s, Binder's father created a company, Magic Music, which used digital storage in the mass-production of cassette tapes. Binder credits his father and grandfather for infusing his early years with "out-of-the-box" ideas that are key to his success in entrepreneurship today.

Prior to his work in the media and telecommunications sectors, Binder was CEO of Leading Golf Courses of America, a nationwide golf membership program that included some of the top golf courses in America. Jack Nicklaus became a partner.

In 1999, Binder and Robert Scheffler started Broadbus Technologies, which used digital storage, but was created instead for video-on-demand entertainment experiences. The company was sold to Motorola in 2006 for an estimated $186 million.

In 2008, Binder joined Dave Fellows, former CTO of Comcast and AT&T Broadband, along with Broadbus executive Vin Bisceglia, to launch Genovation Capital, an early stage venture firm focused on the media space.

Binder invested in This Technology a video-on-demand advertising company, and joined as its Chairman, in 2012. In 2015, the company was sold to Comcast Corp., after raising more than $7 million from General Catalyst and other investors, because it had become an integral part of their platform, according to the CTO of Comcast.

Binder and Fellows founded Layer3 TV in Boston in 2013. In 2014 the company opened a new headquarters in Denver. Under Binder's leadership, the company raised more than $80 Million and was named a Forbes Hottest Startup in 2015 with a valuation of $385 Million.

T-Mobile purchased Layer3 TV in 2018 and Binder became an Executive Vice President and member of the Senior Leadership Team and also led T-Mobile’s TV team. Binder left his positions at T-Mobile a year later in 2019.
