= NinjaOne =

Technology company

- Type: Private
- Industry: IT Services
- Founded: 2013
- Founder: Sal Sferlazza; Chris Matarese
- Headquarters: Austin, Texas, United States
- Website: ninjaone.com

NinjaOne, formerly NinjaRMM, is an American cybersecurity and IT infrastructure technology company based in Austin, Texas that provides endpoint and IT management software for internal IT teams and Managed Service Providers. The company operates globally with major offices in the United States, Germany, the United Kingdom, and Australia.

== Products and services ==
NinjaOne provides a variety of IT and endpoint management features through its core NinjaOne platform. These include endpoint management and security, remote monitoring and management (RMM), remote device access, data backup, and mobile device management. Its core product can be integrated with a number of third-party cybersecurity products including CrowdStrike, Microsoft Intune, ServiceNow, and SentinelOne. NinjaOne is generally considered to be a major player in IT management software subsector with a 2026 report by research and advisory firm Gartner identifying it as a leader in its report on critical capabilities for endpoint management tools. As of September 2025, the company offers NinjaOne for Government, a FedRAMP authorized version of their product for government customers.

A 2025 review of the company's core product by TechRadar praised the company for its user-friendly software and responsive customer support, but noted that it was priced high compared to competitors and lacked flexibility in its reporting features. In 2026, NinjaOne was named editor's choice for endpoint management by popular tech publication BleepingComputer, who praised the product's automation and unified views but remarked that the number of features may be overwhelming for smaller businesses.

=== Outages ===
In May 2026, it was reported that NinjaOne Backup was among a group of several data backup services that were rendered inoperable by a Windows update released the month prior.

== History ==
NinjaOne was founded in 2013 by Sal Sferlazza and Chris Matarese in the San Francisco bay area under the company's original name, NinjaRMM. The company operated in stealth for two years before launching its core platform in 2015, then expanded its offerings to include software patching in 2017. Over the next several years, NinjaOne expanded its footprint, expanding its offices in Clearwater, Florida in 2020 and opening new offices in London and Sydney in 2022.

In 2021, the company relocated its California headquarters to Austin, Texas and rebranded from NinjaRMM to NinjaOne. When asked about the move, CEO Sal Sferlazza cited cost of living, employee interest, and a favorable business environment as reasons for relocating. The same year, NinjaOne expanded its product line to include Ninja Ticketing, an RMM-integrated ticketing tool for IT support.

Audi Revolut F1 car showing NinjaOne logo

In February 2024, NinjaOne raised $231 million in a Series C funding round led by ICONIQ Growth at a valuation of $1.9 billion leading it to be identified by TechCrunch in the news outlet's list of new unicorns for 2024. Later that year, it announced a partnership with cybersecurity company SentinelOne to provide combined IT management and cybersecurity capabilities.

In January 2025, the company announced its intention to acquire cloud storage provider Dropsuite for $252 million, with the deal closing later that year at a final acquisition price of $270 million. It also closed another round of funding led by Iconiq Growth and CapitalG, and in partnership with Sequoia Capital, at a $5 billion valuation. In October, NinjaOne added Patch Intelligence AI to its product offerings to provide AI enabled software patching.

In January 2026, NinjaOne became an official partner of the Audi Revolut F1 Team. Promotional material for the announcement stated that NinjaOne would be the team's official endpoint management provider for the team's factory and trackside operations. Later that year, it was announced that NinjaOne had secured another $400 million in funding at a valuation of $12.3 billion and entered a partnership with technology services distributor GTS. In an interview with IT-focused news outlet CRN, cofounder Chris Matarese stated that the company had surpassed $600 million in annual recurring revenue from more than forty thousand customers.

== Markets and competition ==
According to industry publication Channel Dive, the Remote Monitoring and Management and Professional Services Automation market segment generated more than $20 billion in revenue in 2025 with the top five vendors comprising approximately three quarters of the market. NinjaOne was ranked third among this cohort, earning 14.6% of the total market revenue. The other major companies and products operating in this space are Kaseya, ConnectWise, N-able, and HaloPSA. New IT management startups, such as SuperOps, also compete in this market.

== Acquisitions ==
In January 2025, it was announced that NinjaOne was seeking the acquisition of global cloud backup and archiving software provider Dropsuite at the proposed valuation of $252 million. The acquisition was finalized in June 2025 at a $270 million valuation.

== See also ==
- Remote monitoring and management
- Managed services
- Kaseya
