= Tampon Run =

2014 video game

- Developers: Andrea Gonzales; Sophie Houser
- Composer: Drew Joy
- Platforms: Web, iOS
- Release: 2014 (Web); February 2015 (iOS)

Tampon Run is a 2014 endless running video game about tampons created by Andrea Gonzales and Sophie Houser. It started as a web game made available in 2014 and released on iOS in February 2015.

== Gameplay ==
At the start of Tampon Run, the game explains that de-stigmatizing menstruation is important. The player then controls a character who runs through the level throwing tampons at enemies and collecting more by jumping for boxes. Bumping into enemies causes the loss of some tampons; the game ends if the player runs out.

== Development ==
"It seemed so silly to us that we have all these video games where you can shoot people and kill people, and it's so normal that you can have a video game where you can hold a gun and shoot it but none of us can talk about something so normal like menstruation, which most every woman does for a large portion of her life."

— Sophie Houser, developer

The game was created by Andrea Gonzales and Sophie Houser, two high school students from New York City, who started developing the game during a Girls Who Code camp. The pair designed the concept as a response to feeling like they could not openly discuss menstruation and wanted to create a game which could have a social impact. They cite Wendy Davis' 2013 filibuster as inspiration for the game.

The first version of Tampon Run was built in a week and a half at Girls Who Code. The game was then developed further afterwards and made available online in 2014, subsequently being released on iOS in February 2015. Software development company Pivotal Labs worked with Gonzales and Houser to develop the iOS app, and over seven weeks the team added leaderboards, new enemies, achievements, and other features to the game.

By May 2015, the game had been played 300,000 times across the web and app versions.
