= Block Party (company) =

- Website type: Privacy and security
- Available in: English
- Founded: 2018
- Creator: Tracy Chou
- Founder: Tracy Chou
- CEO: Tracy Chou
- Website: blockpartyapp.com

Block Party is a company that provides a browser plugin to guide users in tweaking their privacy settings on various social media platforms, with an emphasis on helping users protect themselves from harassment. It was founded by software engineer and tech entrepreneur Tracy Chou, who currently serves as the company's CEO.

== History ==
For years, Chou worked in tech companies like Facebook, Pinterest, and Quora where, among developing software, she also became an advocate for diversity and sought to improve product design for marginalized, underrepresented communities.

Chou then founded Block Party in 2018 after having found it difficult to optimize privacy and security settings to one's liking in a litany of social media platforms, as well as after having facing harassment as a woman of color online. As a result, she sought to create an app that would help users optimize their experiences online. Early versions of Block Party were specifically focused on doing so on Twitter. By 2021, when Chou launched the app, Block Party raised nearly $1.5 million in funding after a pre-seed round, as well as individual backing by Ellen Pao, Alexia Bonatsos, and other investors. By 2022, it raised nearly $5 million.

However, Block Party's strategy changed in wake of Elon Musk's changes to Twitter's API upon his assumption leadership. In 2023, Twitter specifically asked Block Party for $42,000 a month for access to its data, which caused the latter to pivot toward creating a browser plugin—for Google Chrome, Microsoft Edge, and Firefox—that walks users through how to optimize their privacy and security settings on a variety of different apps.

In 2026, Block Party was acquired by DeleteMe.

== Compatibility ==
Block Party is currently compatible with the following services:

- Bluesky
- Facebook
- Google
- Instagram
- LinkedIn
- Snapchat (mobile)
- Strava
- TikTok (mobile)
- Twitter
- Venmo
