= Kimberly Bryant (technologist) =

African American electrical engineer

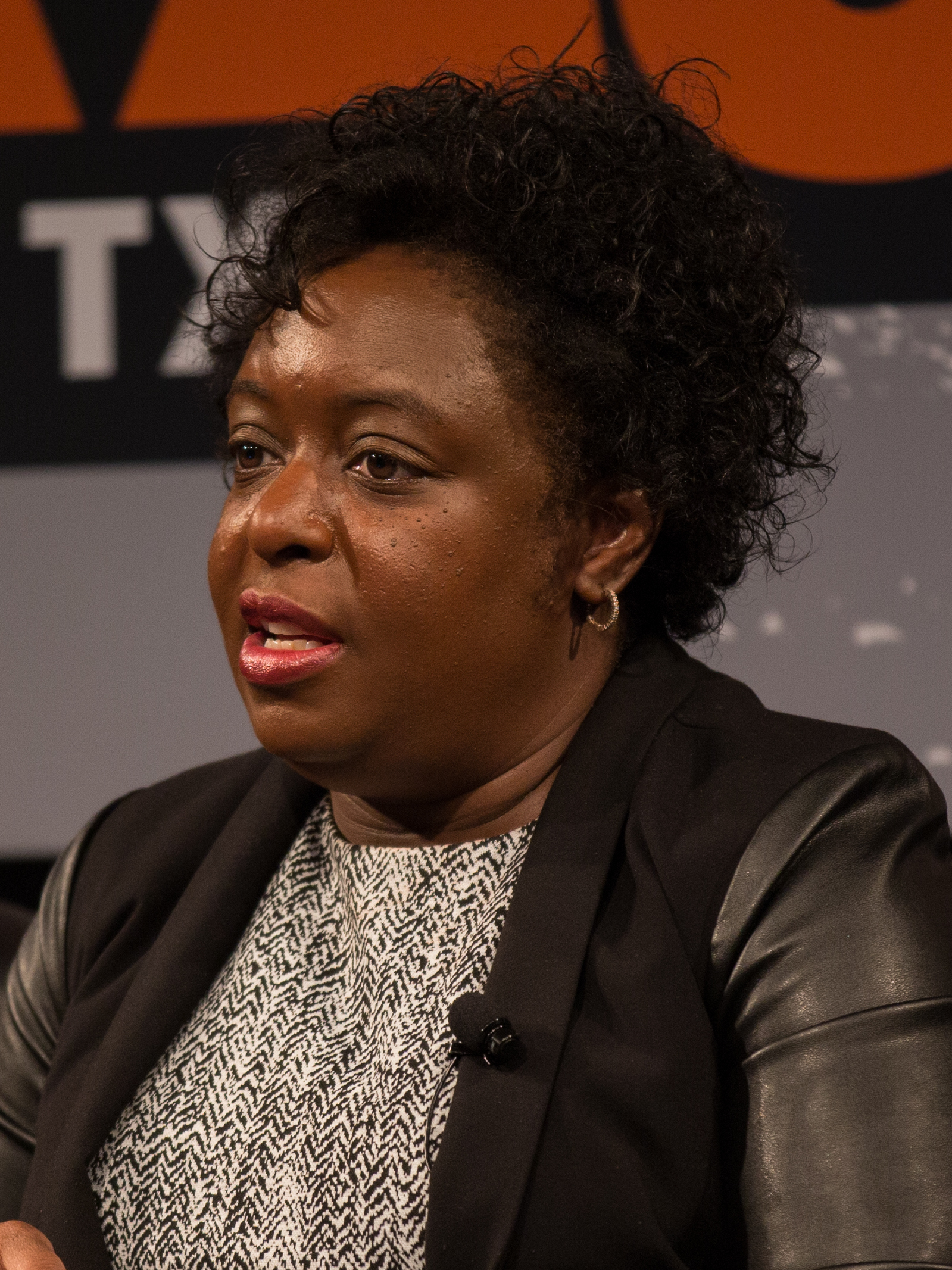
- Kimberly Bryant in 2016
- Born: January 14, 1967 (age 59); Memphis, Tennessee
- Education: Vanderbilt University
- Known for: Founder of Black Girls Code
- Scientific career
- Fields: Electrical Engineering

Kimberly Bryant (born January 14, 1967) is an engineer who worked in the biotechnology field at Genentech, Novartis Vaccines, Diagnostic, and Merck. In 2011, Bryant founded Black Girls Code, a nonprofit organization that focuses on providing technology and computer programming education to African-American girls. After founding Black Girls Code, Bryant was listed as one of the "25 Most Influential African-Americans In Technology" by Business Insider.

== Early life and education ==
Kimberly Bryant was born on January 14, 1967 and raised in Memphis, Tennessee, by a single mother amidst the Civil Rights Movement. She is self-described as a "nerdy girl," excelling in mathematics and science in school. She earned a scholarship to attend Vanderbilt University in 1985, where she planned to become a civil engineer. Enticed by technologies such as the microchip, the personal computer, and the portable cellphone, she switched her major and earned a degree in Electrical Engineering and minors in Computer Science and math in 1989.

== Career ==
Early in her career, Bryant held jobs at electrical companies Westinghouse Electric and DuPont. Later, Bryant would move to biotechnology and later to pharmaceutical companies, where she worked at Pfizer, Merck, and at Genentech and Novartis.

=== Black Girls Code ===
Bryant founded Black Girls Code in 2011 after her daughter expressed an interest in learning computer programming. In her search for available courses in the Bay area, she found that none were well-suited for her daughter. They were taken mostly by boys, and rarely had any other African American girls in attendance. Having experienced isolation herself during her time studying and working, she wanted a better environment for her daughter. Bryant hopes that this endeavor will allow young girls, especially those from minority populations, to remain involved in STEM and increase awareness within the field. African-American women make up less than 3% of the workforce in the tech industry and Black Girls Code fights to change and improve this percentage for the better.

Black Girls Code teaches computer programming to school-age girls in after-school and summer programs. The San Francisco-based nonprofit organization has a goal of teaching one million black girls to code by 2040. The organization already has trained 3,000 girls in fifteen chapters in cities across United States and abroad, including a chapter in Johannesburg, South Africa.

In August 2017 Bryant was involved with turning down a $125,000 donation by Uber which she considered "disingenuous". The donation followed allegations of sexual harassment at Uber. Bryant also noted in her refusal, that Girls Who Code was offered ten times the amount that was offered to Black Girls Code. In February 2018 Black Girls Code partnered with Uber's competitor Lyft – as Bryant considered their values to be better aligned with her own.

Bryant is a thought leader in the area of inclusion in the field of technology, and has spoken on the topic at events such as TedX Kansas City, TedX San Francisco, Platform Summit, Big Ideas Festival, and SXSW.

After three employees resigned in 2021, citing "cultural and interpersonal issues", the board of directors for Black Girls Code indefinitely placed Bryant on administrative paid leave on December 23, 2021, in order to investigate "serious allegations of workplace impropriety. In August 2022, Bryant was formally fired, after which she filed a federal lawsuit alleging wrongful suspension, and that board members with a conflict of interest were pursuing "self-serving motives". On August 22, Bryant was sued by Black Girls Code after she redirected the organization's website to a separate page announcing her lawsuit.

=== Ascend Ventures ===
After leaving Black Girls Code, Bryant founded the investment firm Ascend Ventures which launched the Black Innovation Lab, a Memphis startup accelerator for underrepresented founders.

=== Boards ===
Bryant serves on the National Champions Board for the National Girls Collaborative Project, a charitable organization whose vision is to bring together organizations across the United States that are committed to informing and encouraging girls to pursue careers in STEM. She also serves on the board of the National Center for Women & Information Technology (NCWIT) K-12 Alliance, a group dedicated to creating access to an inclusive computing education for girls everywhere.

=== Recognition ===
In 2012, Bryant received the prestigious Jefferson Award for Community Service for her work to support Bay Area communities with Black Girls Code.

In 2013, was recognized as a White House Champion of Change for Tech Inclusion. That same year, she was voted one of the 25 Most Influential African-Americans In Technology by Business Insider, awarded the Pahara-Aspen Education Fellowship, and named to The Root 100 and the Ebony Power 100 lists.

In 2014, Bryant was the recipient of Smithsonian Magazine's American Ingenuity Award for Social Progress. She also was one of the winners of the POLITICO Women Who Rule Award.

In 2016, Bryant was inducted into the Women in Technology International Hall of Fame.

In 2019, Bryant was one of 65 finalists across 13 categories to present their projects at the 22nd annual Interactive Innovation awards presented by KPMG. She was also presented the SXSW Interactive Festival Hall of Fame award.

=== Keynotes ===
Bryant was a keynote speaker in 2021 SXSW EDU.
