= Dropmyemail =

E-mail backup service

- Developers: Dropmysite Pte. Ltd. and Dropsuite Limited
- Release: March 2012
- Written in: Ruby on Rails
- Available in: English, Portuguese, Japanese, Vietnamese, Dutch, French, Spanish, Japanese
- Type: Online backup service
- Website: dropmyemail.com

Dropmyemail is a cloud-based e-mail backup service owned by Dropmysite. It allows users to automatically backup their e-mails with the ability to view, migrate or restore them via web browser.

== Overview ==
Dropmyemail was conceived by John Fearon. The site was launched in March 2012 at Demo Asia, a conference for emerging technology, in Singapore.

Dropmyemail's backend is written in Ruby on Rails and hosted on Amazon Web Services' Cloud Infrastructure. It supports e-mail platforms such as Gmail, Hotmail and Yahoo, and it can also be used with other services via IMAP or POP settings.

== Business model ==
On November 21, 2012, Dropmyemail introduced business plans for SoHO and SMB based on per e-mail mailbox pricing. It also changed from a Freemium business model to a 15-day Free Trial model.

The company introduced an affiliate program on December 13, 2012. This allows others to resell Dropmyemail's service.
