= Black Girls Code =

US-based non-profit organization

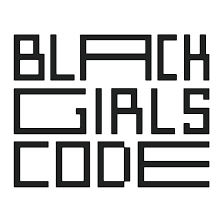
- Abbreviation: BGC
- Formation: 2011
- Founder: Kimberly Bryant
- Purpose: introducing Black and brown girls ages 7–17 to computer programming to ignite their interest in technology and change the face of STEM.
- Headquarters: Oakland, California
- Region served: United States, South Africa
- Website: www.wearebgc.org

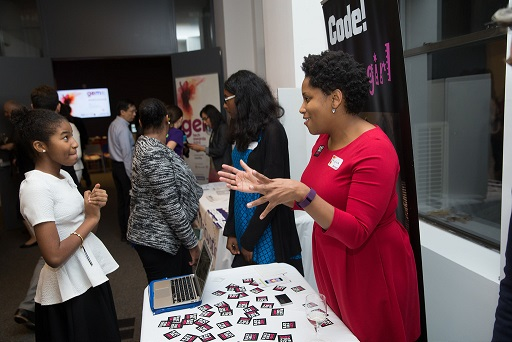
A Black Girls Code booth at the 2015 GEM-TECH awards organized by ITU

Black Girls Code (BGC) is a nonprofit organization that focuses on engaging African-American girls and other youth of color with computer programming education to nurture their careers in tech. The organization offers computer programming and coding, as well as website, robot, and mobile application-building, with the goal of placing one million girls in tech by 2040. Kimberly Bryant, an electrical engineer who had worked in biotech for over 20 years, founded Black Girls Code in 2011 to rectify the underrepresentation of African-American girls and women in tech careers. In October 2023, Cristina Jones became CEO; she was previously an executive at Salesforce.

== Programs ==
Headquartered in Oakland, California, the organization grew to 2,000 participants by August 2013 within the seven established institutions, operating in seven States across the US, as well as in Johannesburg, South Africa. As of December 2019, BGC had 15 chapters.

BGC depends on a volunteer network to design and conduct workshop classes. These IT professionals teach participants skills in web, app, and game development; AI; art and music coding; coding languages (i.e., HTML/CSS, JavaScript, Python); block-based coding; and integrated development environments (i.e., Scratch, p5.js, MIT App Inventor, Repl.it, EarSketch).

In 2023, BGC, in partnership with GoldieBlox, launched CODE Along, a video series of coding tutorials.

== History ==
=== Founding ===
Bryant was inspired to start BGC after her gamer daughter, Kai, attended a computing summer camp and was disappointed in the experience. Her daughter was one in a handful of girls who were at the camp and was the only African American girl present. She also noted that the boys at the camp were given much more attention from the counselors than the few girls there. In an interview with Ebony, Bryant said, "I wanted to find a way to engage and interest my daughter in becoming a digital creative instead of just a consumer, and I did not find other programs that were targeted to girls like her from underrepresented communities."

In 2011, Bryant convinced her colleagues from Genentech to create a six-week coding curriculum for Girls of Color. Her first educational series started in the basement of a college prep institution, and attended by a dozen girls, including her daughter. In January 2012, a tech consultancy company called ThoughtWorks invested in Bryant's initiative, providing access to space and resources.

=== Leadership transition ===
Bryant was removed as head of the organization by the board in 2021 following complaints related to her conduct. The organization then sued Bryant for "hijacking" its website, while she also filed a federal lawsuit accusing board members of defamation, retaliation and wrongful termination from her position as CEO.

In October 2023, the Black Girls Code board appointed former Salesforce executive Cristina Jones as its new CEO.

== Awards and grants ==
BGC received a $50,000 grant from Microsoft's Azure development (AzureDev) community campaign in January 2014. Bryant also received a "Standing O-vation" presented by Oprah Winfrey and Toyota in November 2014.

In August 2015, Bryant turned down a $125,000 grant from ride-sharing app Uber, calling the offer disingenuous and "PR-driven". She also criticized Uber for offering Girls Who Code $1.2 million, an amount nearly ten times larger.

In February 2018, BGC announced a partnership with Uber's competitor, Lyft, as part of their Round Up & Donate program.

== See also ==
- Native Girls Code
- I Look Like an Engineer
