= CRV (venture capital firm) =

American venture capital firm

CRV, LLC
- Formerly: Charles River Ventures
- Type: Private
- Industry: Venture capital
- Founded: 1970; 56 years ago
- Headquarters: Palo Alto, California, United States
- Products: Investments
- Total assets: $4.3 billion
- Number of employees: 20+
- Website: www.crv.com

CRV, formerly Charles River Ventures, is an American venture capital firm focused on early-stage investments in technology. The firm was founded in 1970 to commercialize research that came out of MIT. Its name comes from the Boston area Charles River.

== History ==
Charles River Ventures was established in 1970 in Boston, Massachusetts. Dick Burnes, founder of Teradyne, helped found the firm.

By the early 2000s, the firm opened an office in Silicon Valley.

The firm has raised over $4.3 billion since inception across 18 funds. Upon closing of the 16th fund, the firm rebranded to CRV. Prior to that, CRV's 15th fund closed in February 2012 with $375 million of investor commitments. CRV's 14th fund raised $320 million of commitments.

In 2013, it invested $15 million in Pebble Technology, which was credited as the primary reason why Pebble was acquired by Fitbit in December 2016. This netted CRV a $40 million return.

In 2024, CRV returned 275 million dollars from the 500 million it had raised in its current fund back to investors, stating that their focus would shift away from late-stage investments and toward the early stage.

Among CRV's portfolio companies are Aveksa, DoorDash, mabl, OneLogin, Stella, Sybase, Yammer, and Zendesk.
