= Lasso Logic =

- Industry: Computer software
- Founded: 2003; 23 years ago
- Fate: Acquired (2005)
- Headquarters: San Francisco, California, U.S.
- Products: Lasso CDP, Now SonicWALL CDP

Lasso Logic was a company formed in 2003 that pioneered continuous data protection (CDP) and an onsite–offsite backup technology for the small and medium enterprise market (SME). It was based in San Francisco.

Lasso Logic was the first company to provide a disk-based continuous data protection appliance, called Lasso CDP, which continually backed up servers, applications, PCs, and laptops to itself in real time. This allowed users who lost files to go back to various useful points in time. More recent backups were saved at more frequent intervals, but as backup versions receded in time, some of those versions were dropped by way of a complex algorithm which preserved theoretically more useful versions. Thus a user could always find a version to return to from the inception of backup, from minutes ago to years ago. Before Lasso Logic, the only backup options were single point in time (SPIT) snapshot software that allowed IT administrators to back up to tape or to disk, usually at a resolution of once a day. The value proposition of the company was "set it and forget it" backup, thus eliminating the labor burden of tape-based backup.

The company was also the first to introduce onsite and offsite backup in a single device. Lasso CDP continuously backed up data to itself, but then replicated data to an offsite location. This allowed for instant recovery of data because the files were stored locally on the Lasso CDP appliance. However, in the event of a total loss of data locally, including the Lasso CDP appliance, the customer could pull the data back from Lasso's offsite data center.

Lasso Logic and another company, enKoo, were acquired by SonicWALL in November 2005 for approximately $20 million total. Lasso Logic became the third of three business divisions at SonicWALL, and called the Business Continuity Unit. Lasso CDP was renamed to SonicWALL CDP. The founders of Lasso Logic became the founding team behind PacketTrap Networks, a network management software company located in Silicon Valley.
