= Virtual lab automation =

Virtual Lab Automation refers to a category of software solutions to automate IT labs using virtualization technology.
