= Ingram Micro =

American technology distributor

Ingram Micro Holding Corporation

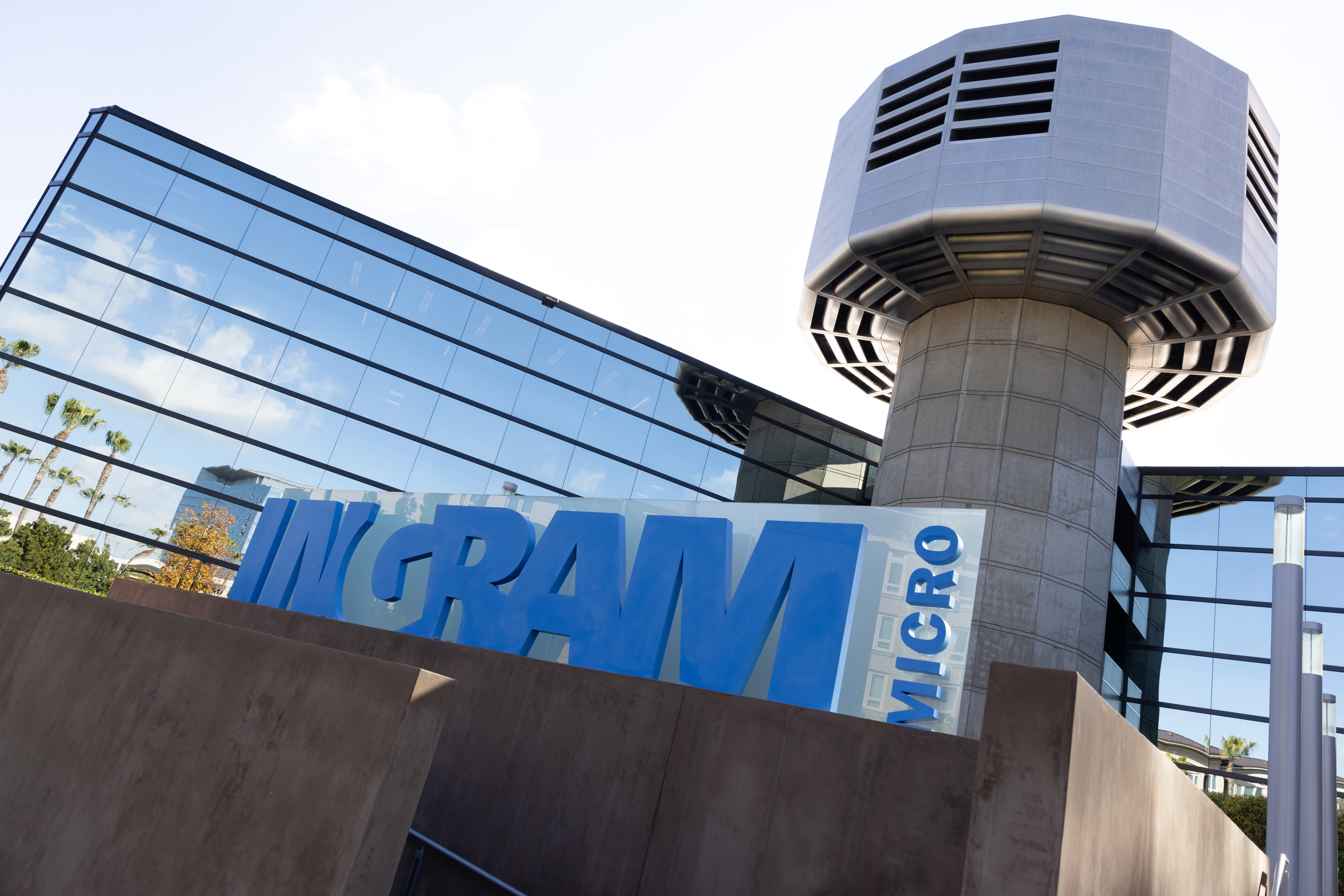
- Ingram Micro's headquarters in Irvine, California
- Formerly: Ingram Micro Inc. (1979-2020)
- Type: Public
- Traded as: NYSE: INGM; NYSE: IM (1996-2016)
- Industry: Information technology
- Founded: 1979; 47 years ago
- Headquarters: Irvine, California, U.S.
- Key people: Alain Monié (Board Chairman); Paul Bay (CEO); Mike Zilis (CFO)
- Products: Lifecycle services, software, commerce & fulfillment services, technology services, cloud
- Revenue: ▲US$ 52.6 billion (2025)
- Net income: ▲US$ 328 million (2025)
- Number of employees: 23,500
- Parent: Platinum Equity
- Website: www.ingrammicro.com

Ingram Micro Holding Corporation is an American distributor of information technology products and services. The company is based in Irvine, California, U.S., and has operations around the world. Founded as Micro D, Inc. in 1979 in California by Geza Czige and Lorraine Mecca, the company was originally a traditional distributor focused on marketing, selling, and shipping vendor products to resellers. It has since repositioned itself as a platform-based business centered on its business-to-business (B2B) digital experience platform.

As one of the world's largest technology distributors, Ingram Micro purchases hardware, software, and cloud services from manufacturers and resells them to resellers, managed service providers, and other channel partners, holding inventory on its balance sheet. This wholesale distribution model is inventory- and capital-intensive rather than asset-light. For fiscal year 2025, the company reported net sales of $52.6 billion, an increase of 9.5% over the prior year, and roughly 23,500 employees serving more than 161,000 customers worldwide.

== Xvantage platform ==
Xvantage is Ingram Micro's AI-powered B2B digital experience platform. The company launched it in September 2022 in the United States and Germany, describing it as a "digital twin" intended to consolidate hardware, cloud, and software transactions, pricing, order tracking, and billing into a single system. Ingram has described the platform as the foundation of its broader strategy of repositioning itself from a technology distributor into a "platform company," reporting that it comprises a real-time, global data mesh, more than 300 artificial intelligence and machine learning models, and 20 proprietary digital engines. By automating functions such as quote creation, order management, and real-time tracking, the platform is intended to give vendor partners and customers what the company describes as a business-to-consumer-like experience.

=== Rollout ===
At launch, Ingram Micro said it planned a global "rest of world" rollout in early 2023. As of mid-2025, the company reported that the platform was active in 20 of the 57 countries in which it operated. By the end of fiscal year 2025, Ingram Micro said that the majority of its net sales were flowing through the platform.

=== Strategy and recognition ===
The platform's development has been championed by CEO Paul Bay as a defining initiative of his tenure, and the company credits his leadership with its development and global rollout. In June 2025, the company launched Enable AI, a guided educational program intended to prepare channel partners to sell and deploy artificial intelligence solutions, and it has said it filed more than 35 patents related to the platform. Xvantage has received several industry awards, including the 2024 BIG Innovation Award and recognition from ChannelPro and the Stockies awards (see Recognition).

== History ==
=== Early history ===
Ingram Micro's origins trace back to the founding of distributor Micro D, Inc. in July 1979 by the husband-and-wife team of Geza Czige and Lorraine Mecca, both of whom were teachers. The company started in Southern California and in its first year of business achieved approximately $3.5 million in sales.

Meanwhile, in 1982, entrepreneurs Ronald Schreiber, Irwin Schreiber, Gerald Lippes, and Paul Willax founded Software Distribution Services in Buffalo, New York. Ingram Distribution Group, a unit of the privately held Ingram Industries, acquired Software Distribution Services in the spring of 1985 and renamed it Ingram Software. The operation was renamed Ingram Computer in February 1988.

After acquiring the remaining publicly traded shares of Micro D in 1989, Ingram Industries merged these two former competitors to create the microcomputer industry's first $1 billion computer-products wholesale distribution company, renaming it Ingram Micro D.

In August 1993, Ingram Micro Belgium acquired Zaventem Electronic Dealer Distribution (Zedd) and many of its assets, including the right to distribute Hewlett-Packard products. In 1996, Ingram Micro became a publicly traded company on the New York Stock Exchange, with revenues exceeding $12 billion.

In July 2005, Ingram Micro purchased AVAD, LLC, a wholesale distributor of home automation and audio/visual gear. It sold this subsidiary in July 2016. A Shared Services Center in Manila, Philippines, began operations in May 2009, followed by another in Sofia, Bulgaria, in 2012. Over time, Ingram Micro built a presence in areas adjacent to its traditional distribution business, including enterprise computing, automatic identification and data capture (AIDC), point-of-sale (POS), managed and professional services, warranty maintenance, mobility, physical security, and consumer electronics.

=== 2010s ===
In November 2010, Ingram Micro launched Cloud Marketplace, serving value-added resellers (VARs), managed service providers (MSPs), software as a service (SaaS), and other cloud-based services.

In 2014, Ingram Micro expanded further into cloud computing, including software-, platform-, and infrastructure-as-a-service. In June 2014, the company introduced a new logo and the tagline "Ingram Micro helps businesses realize the promise of technology."

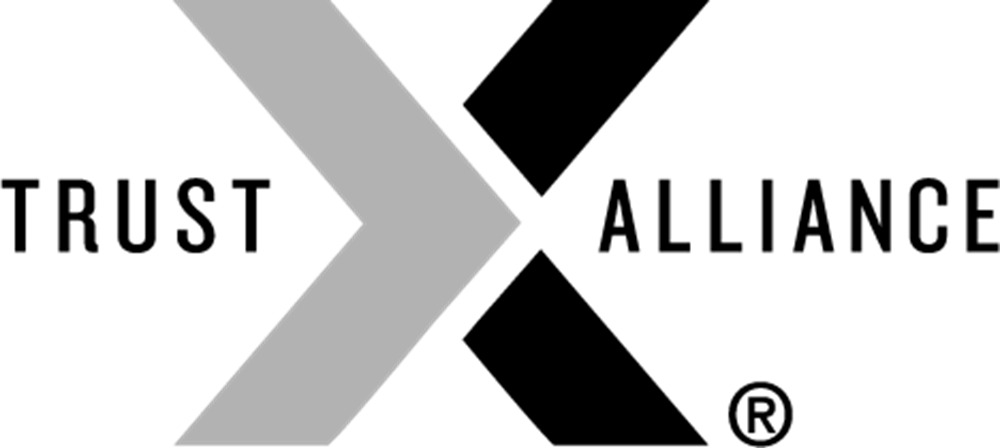
Trust X Alliance logo

In November 2015, after 17 years, Ingram Micro renamed its VentureTech Network as Trust X Alliance. In December 2015, Ingram Micro acquired the Odin Service Automation platform from Parallels for $163.9 million, strengthening its cloud-services capabilities. In May 2016, it acquired Comms-care, a U.K.-based IT support provider.

In February 2016, Ingram Micro agreed to a $6 billion acquisition by Tianjin Tianhai Investment, an HNA Group affiliate, becoming its subsidiary. Alain Monié, Ingram's chief executive, remained in place, and HNA Group director Tan Xiangdong was elected to Ingram Micro's seven-member board of directors. The transaction reportedly made Ingram the biggest revenue generator for HNA Group, with the strategic aim of reaching emerging markets that offered higher growth and better profitability, supported by HNA Group's logistics operations and presence in China. The acquisition was completed in December 2016.

In October 2017, Ingram Micro partnered with DocuSign. In December 2017, it acquired Cloud Harmonics, expanding its cybersecurity capabilities. In May 2018, Ingram Micro formed the cloud platform division CloudBlue, which was later acquired by HostPapa in 2025.

=== 2020s ===
==== Ownership changes and return to public markets ====
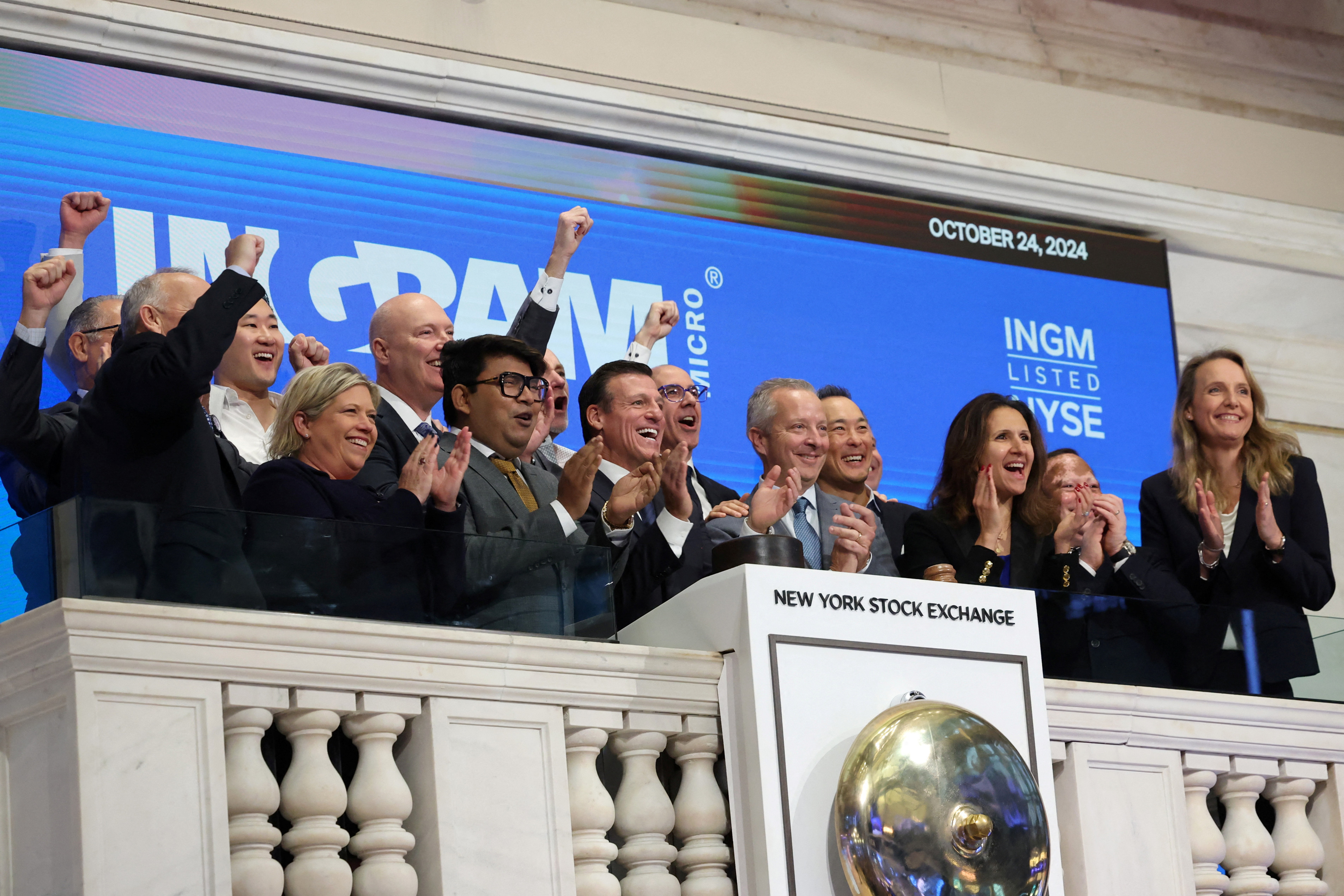
Ingram Micro (INGM) returned to the New York Stock Exchange on October 24, 2024

In December 2020, Platinum Equity announced its intent to acquire Ingram Micro from HNA Technology Co. in an all-cash transaction with an equity value of approximately $7.2 billion. The transaction was completed in July 2021. In December 2021, CEVA Logistics, a subsidiary of CMA CGM, announced plans to acquire Ingram Micro's third-party logistics arm, Commerce & Lifecycle Services (CLS). The acquisition was completed in April 2022. In January 2022, Paul Bay was named Ingram Micro's CEO, succeeding Alain Monié, who stepped down after a decade in the role. On October 15, 2024, Ingram Micro launched a second initial public offering, targeting a valuation of about $5.4 billion. The company's stock began trading on the NYSE under the ticker INGM on October 24, 2024, with shares rising 15% on their debut and valuing the company at roughly $6 billion.

==== Platform transformation ====
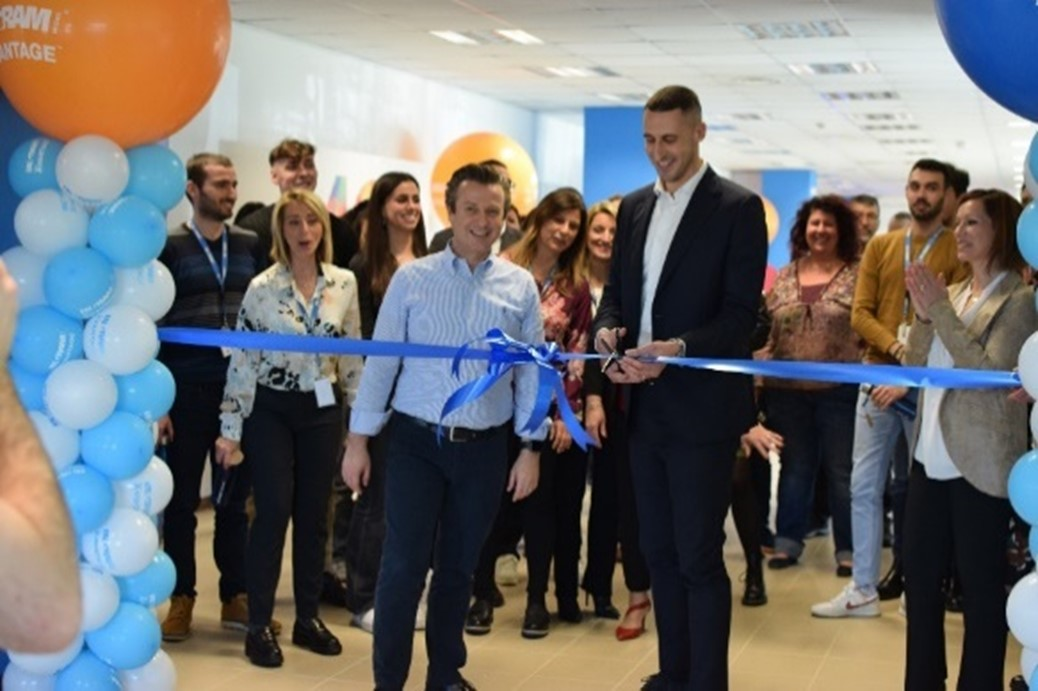
Ingram Micro previewed its Xvantage platform ecosystem in May 2022

In May 2022, Ingram Micro previewed its digital experience platform ecosystem, Ingram Micro Xvantage, at its Cloud Summit, describing it as built on a real-time global data mesh and several proprietary engines. In September 2022, the company introduced Xvantage in two of its largest markets, the United States and Germany.

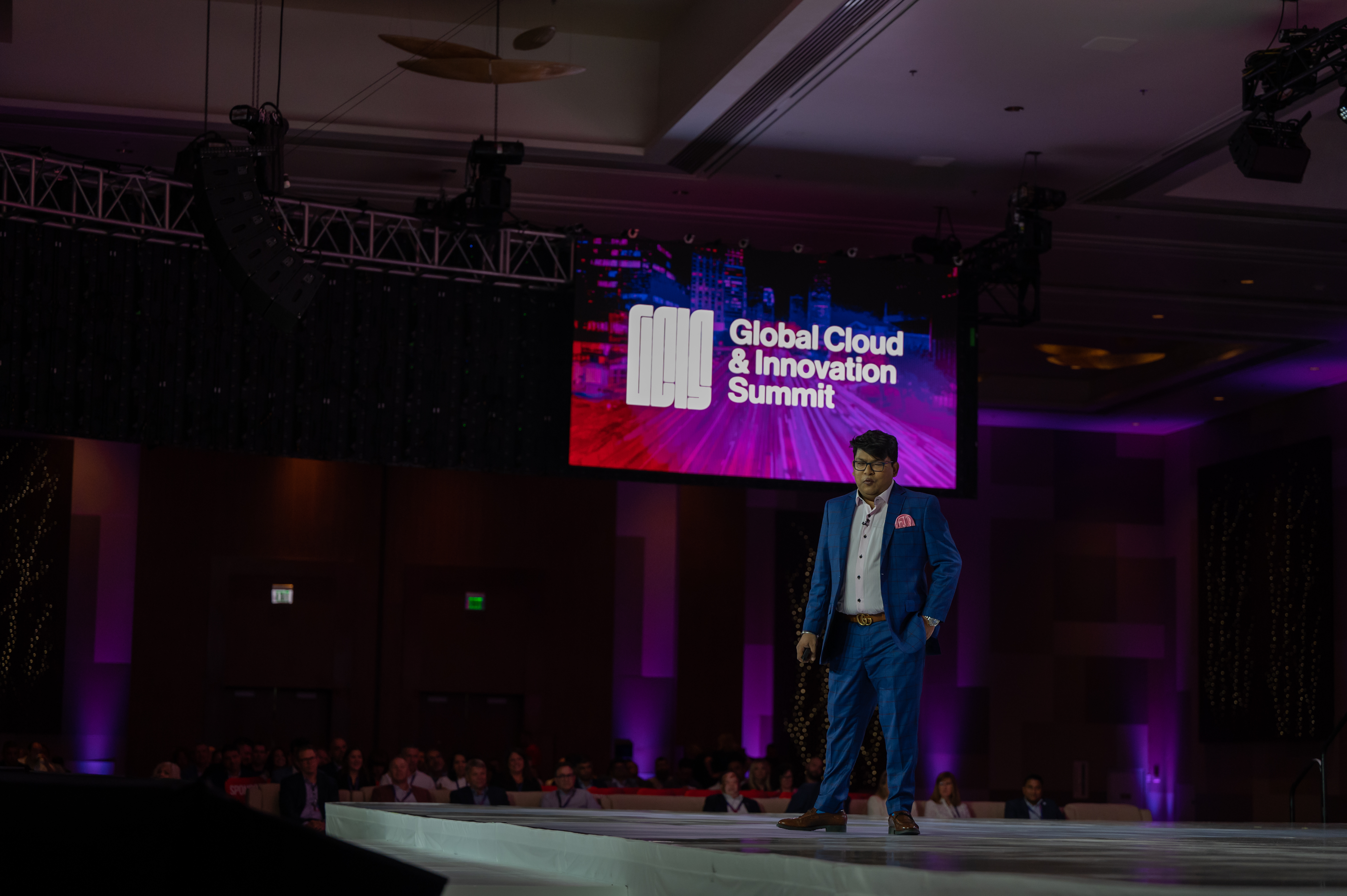
The 2023 Global Cloud and Innovation Summit in Las Vegas, Nevada

At the 2023 Global Cloud and Innovation Summit in Las Vegas, Ingram Micro announced the integration of its Cloud Marketplace with the Xvantage platform. In October 2023, the company launched an Xvantage mobile app providing real-time order status, tracking, renewals, and subscription billing. Xvantage launched in the United Kingdom in February 2024.

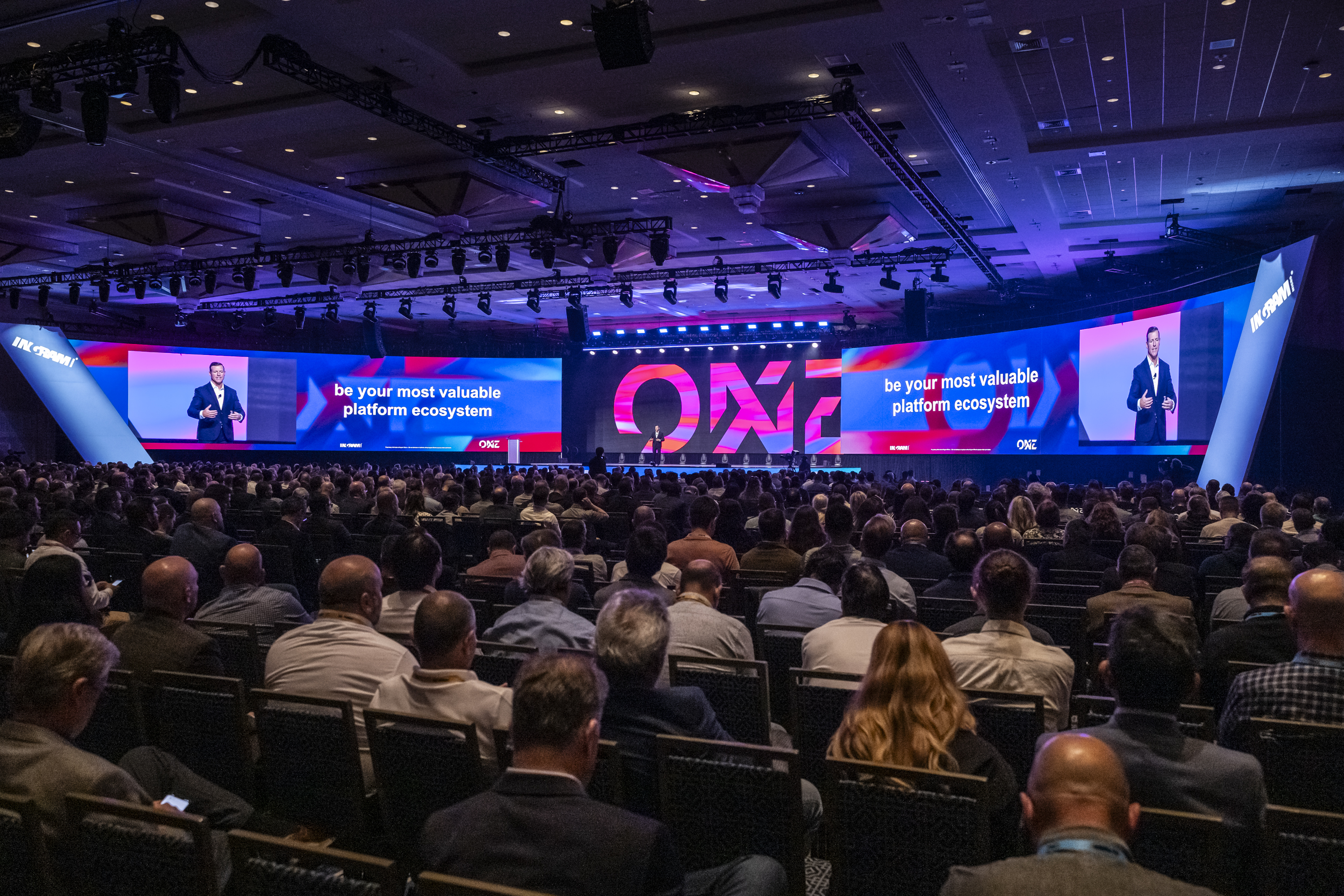
The Ingram Micro ONE flagship conference, held November 6–8, 2024, in Oxon Hill, Maryland

The Ingram Micro ONE flagship conference was held November 6–8, 2024, in Oxon Hill, Maryland. In November 2024, Ingram Micro introduced its Ultra loyalty program, offering partners enhanced incentives, data-driven insights, expert support, and application integration.

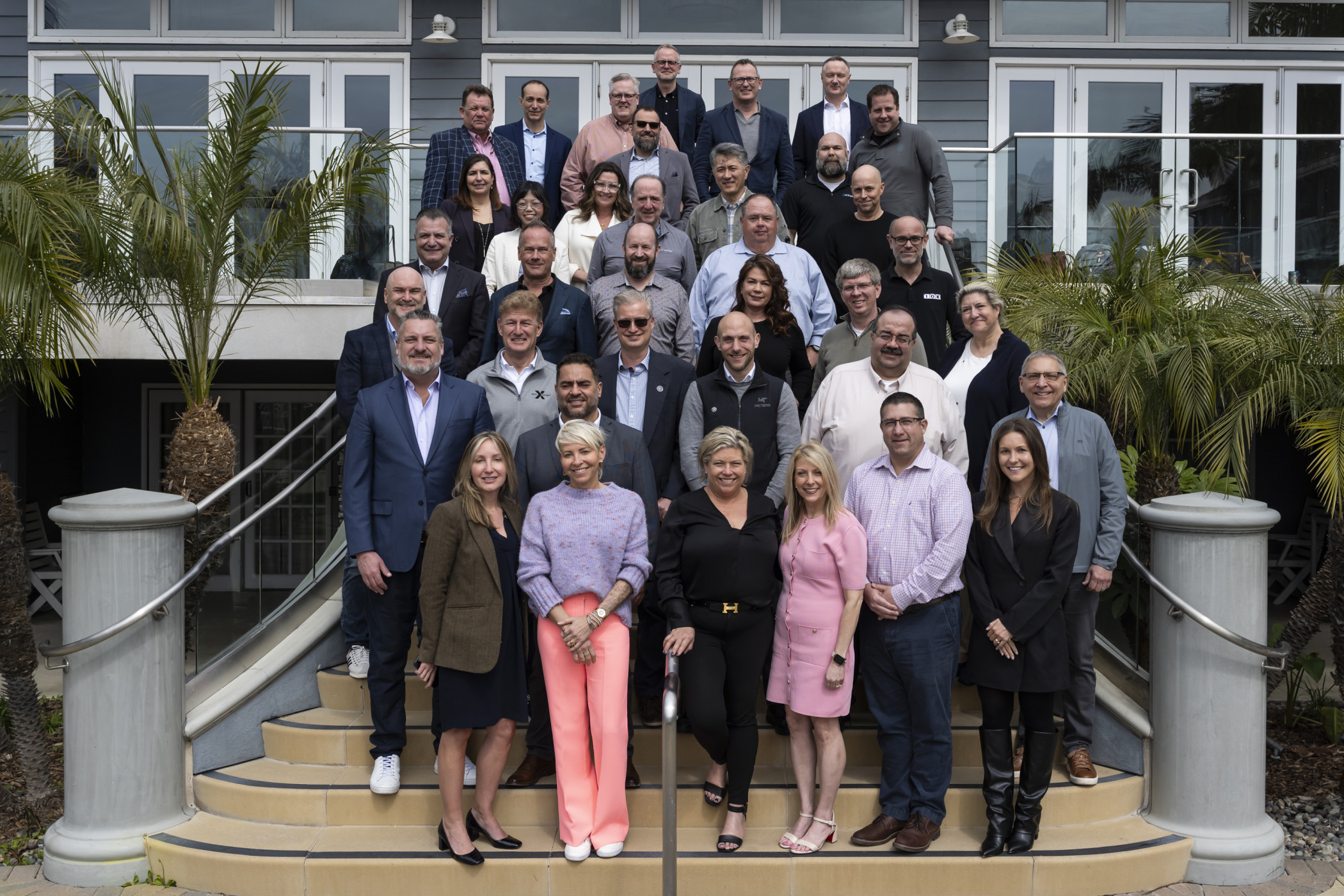
Ingram Micro's Trust X Alliance in March 2025

In January 2025, Ingram Micro unified its SMB Alliance and Trust X Alliance into a single global community under the Trust X Alliance name, forming a network of more than 600 partners. In June 2025, Ingram Micro launched its Enable AI program for channel partners.

==== Financial performance ====
Following its return to the public markets, Ingram Micro reported continued sales growth and improving operating efficiency through fiscal year 2025; the company's financial results under CEO Paul Bay are described in greater detail below (see Leadership under Paul Bay). In early 2026, the company's board declared a quarterly cash dividend of $0.082 per share.

== Leadership under Paul Bay ==
Paul Bay became Ingram Micro's chief executive officer in January 2022, succeeding Alain Monié, who moved to the role of executive chairman after a decade leading the company. Bay first joined Ingram Micro in sales in 1995, rising to senior vice president of vendor management before leaving in 2006 to serve as chief executive of Punch! Software. He returned in 2010 as executive vice president and president for North America, and subsequently led the Americas region and the company's worldwide Global Technology Solutions business before being named CEO.

=== Platform company strategy ===
Under Bay, Ingram Micro accelerated a strategic shift from a traditional technology distributor toward what the company describes as a business-to-business (B2B) "platform company," with the stated goal of bringing a business-to-consumer-like experience to channel commerce and removing friction from B2B transactions. Bay framed this as a transition from a decades-old distribution leader into a digital-first ecosystem connecting vendors, resellers, and customers.

=== Birth of Xvantage ===
Central to the strategy is Xvantage, the company's AI-powered digital experience platform. Bay has cited the platform as a defining initiative of his tenure, overseeing the effort that began around 2021 to build an AI-driven business platform for the company's team members, customers, and vendor partners, which Ingram Micro previewed in 2022 and launched commercially that September in the United States and Germany. The company's own materials credit Bay's leadership with the development and global expansion of the patented platform. Bay cited Xvantage's role in effectively defending against the major global outage that occurred in July 2025 due to a ransomware attack. According to him, the system allowed Ingram Micro to recover from the attack faster. Bay has been named repeatedly to CRN's list of the most influential channel executives.

=== Return to public markets and financial performance ===
In October 2024, Bay led Ingram Micro's return to the public markets, with the company listing on the New York Stock Exchange under the ticker INGM after roughly eight years of private ownership under HNA Group and later Platinum Equity. In the years following the IPO, the company reported improving operating leverage and cash generation alongside continued sales growth. For fiscal year 2025, Ingram Micro reported net sales of $52.6 billion, up 9.5% over 2024, with growth across all four of its geographic segments; GAAP diluted earnings per share rose to $1.39 from $1.18 the prior year, and the company generated what its chief financial officer called its highest quarterly free cash flow in more than a decade. Bay attributed part of the company's improving efficiency to the Xvantage platform, through which he said the majority of net sales were flowing by the end of 2025.

== Notable employees ==
Former U.S. Congressman Chris Lee once worked at Ingram Micro.

Bülent Ural, who works as a sales consultant for Ingram Micro's German branch, was a member of the German-Turkish musical group Sürpriz, which represented Germany in the Eurovision Song Contest 1999.

== Acquisitions ==
- 2004 – acquired Tech Pacific, an IT distributor, significantly increasing its presence in the Asia-Pacific region
- 2012 – acquired BrightPoint, a mobile device lifecycle services company
- 2013 – acquired CloudBlue, an ITAD company
- 2015 – acquired DocData, an e-commerce fulfillment provider in Europe
- 2019 – acquired Abbakan, a French cybersecurity distributor
- 2020 – acquired Harmony PSA to further the CloudBlue platform
- 2021 – acquired BRLink, a Brazilian MSP

== Recognition ==
Selected awards for Ingram Micro include:

- 2023 Technology Reseller Editor's Choice Award, based on the criteria of design, innovation, and functionality
- 2024 Business Intelligence Group BIG Innovation Award (Xvantage)
- Stockies Awards: Platform Distributor of the Year (UK)
- 2023 ChannelPro SMB All-Star Award (Xvantage)
- AWS Global Distributor Partner of the Year (multiple years)
- Microsoft: Americas Distributor Partner of the Year (Americas)
- Microsoft: Microsoft Surface EMEA Distributor of the Year (EMEA)
