= Dropsuite =

Australian software company

- Type: Public
- Traded as: ASX: DSE
- Industry: Information technology
- Founded: 2012; 14 years ago
- Founder: John Fearon
- Headquarters: Melbourne, Australia
- Products: Backup and Archiving for Microsoft 365; Backup for G Suite Gmail; Back for QuickBooks Online; Backup and Archiving for GovCloud; Backup for Hosted Exchange; Backup for IMAP-POP; Backup for Open-Xchange; Email Archiving; Website Backup
- Owner: NinjaOne
- Website: www.dropsuite.com

Dropsuite Limited (formerly branded as Dropmysite) is a software platform founded in 2011 that provides cloud backup, archiving and recovery services.

== Overview ==
Listed on the Australian Securities Exchange for nine years, it is headquartered in Melbourne, Australia and has offices and remote staff throughout the world.

Originally, Dropsuite only provided website backup services, but expanded services to include Cloud Backup for Microsoft 365, Cloud Backup for G Suite Gmail, email archiving, QuickBooks Online backup, and GovCloud backup and archiving. Additional products include GDPR Responder, eDiscovery, Insights BI and Ransomware Protection.

== Corporation ==
=== Company History ===
Dropsuite began development under the name Dropmysite in September 2011 when John Fearon’s business website needed a backup solution and he couldn’t find a service that met his needs. Fearon raised $300,000 in a first round of funding on a Singaporean television show called Angel’s Gate. In 2012, he created an email backup service called Dropmyemail. On October 31, 2013, Charif Elansari took over as CEO. In 2014, a smartphone backup service called Dropmymobile was launched.

Dropmysite has local offices in the US, Singapore, Japan and India. It has entered into partnership with Xpress Hosting, a web-hosting company in Mexico for getting access to 100,000 customers and 500,000 domains. Dropmysite has also announced partnerships with GMO Cloud and paperboy in Japan.

On October 3, 2015, GoDaddy launched a cloud backup service for websites powered by Dropmysite. On December 29, 2016, the year it was renamed Dropsuite, the company went public on the Australia Securities Exchange via a backdoor listing (ASX:DSE).

On October 22, 2018, a year after entering into a distribution agreement with Ingram Micro, it entered into a cloud distribution partnership with Pax8. In 2019, DSD Europe announced a partnership with Dropsuite and is adding Dropsuite’s Microsoft Office 365 Cloud backup and email backup to their cloud backup services.

In January 2025, NinjaOne announced the intended acquisition of Dropsuite, subject to shareholder and regulatory approval, for a total of about $252 million (USD). In June, NinjaOne reported having completed the purchase of the firm for $270 million (USD).

=== Management team ===
The management team consists of people of different continents including Asia, Africa, and North America and Australia.

- Chairman—Theo Hnarakis
- Non-Executive Director—Bruce Tonkin
- CEO—⁣Charif El-Ansari
- CTO—Manoj Kalyanaraman
- CFO—⁣Bill Kyriacou
- CPO—Mark Kirstein
- SVP, Sales and Marketing—Eric Roach

=== Investors ===
Dropsuite Limited (ASX:DSE) is a publicly listed company on the Australian Securities Exchange. Originally, Dropmysite is a privately held technology startup that received seed funding for from Crystal Horse Investments, Stanley Street Labs and a few angel investors.

== Technology ==
The backend of Dropmysite was originally based on Amazon AWS Infrastructure. Dropsuite provides data backup support to many country-locations in The Americas, Europe, Asia, and Africa. It utilizes Amazon Web Services data center support to ensure that data remains within country borders, if needed. All user data is stored online and there are no user agents to download and install.

Dropsuite's cloud services protect users' information with military-grade 256-bit advanced encryption, allow legal grade email archiving and are compatible with Microsoft Office 365 and, G Suite Gmail, Hosted Exchange, Open-Xchange and most IMAP/POP email servers.
