= Girls Who Code =

Nonprofit organization

- Formation: 2012
- Founder: Reshma Saujani
- CEO: Tarika Barrett
- Website: girlswhocode.com

Girls Who Code (also known as GWC) is an international nonprofit organization that aims to support and increase the number of women in computer science. Among its programs are a summer immersion program, a specialized campus program, after-school clubs, a college club, College Loops, and a series of books. The organization is based in New York and has programs in all of the United States, Canada, India, and the United Kingdom. As of 2022, there were nearly 600,000 Girls Who Code alumnae.

== History ==
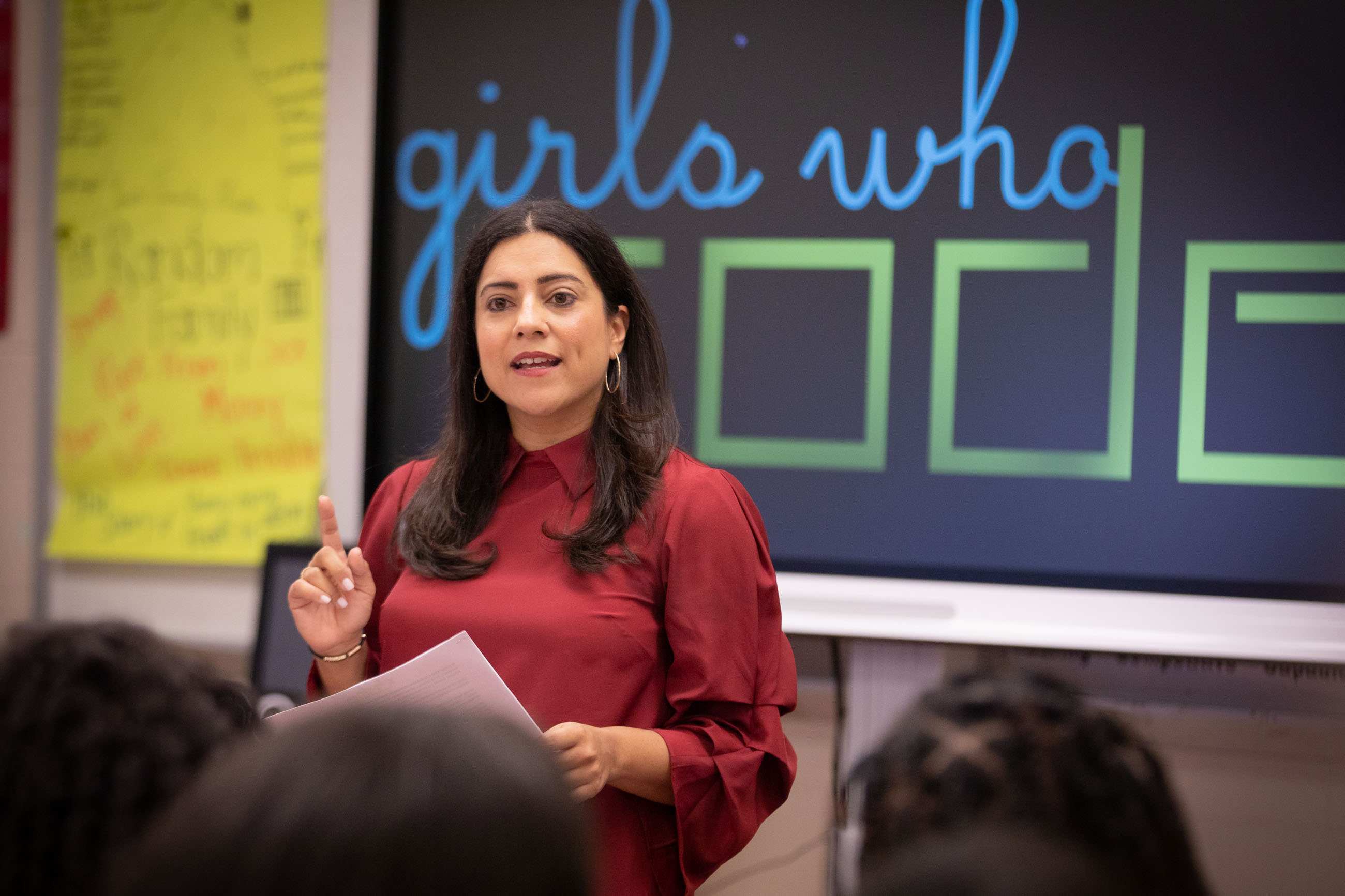
Reshma Saujani, Girls Who Code founder

Girls Who Code was founded by Reshma Saujani in 2012. She came up with the idea of creating the organization during her run for the United States Congress. Reshma's inspiration stemmed from finding that schools along her campaign route lacked female representation in computer science classrooms. The organization began under the White House Science & Technology Initiative. The second hire and founding curriculum director was Ashley Gavin before her career as a comedian. Girls Who Code runs programs during the academic year teaching high school girls computing skills such as programming, robotics, and web design, with sessions including projects and trips to companies such as Twitter and Facebook. As of 2014, there were more than 1,500 Girls Who Code clubs across America. By December 2014, three thousand students had completed a Girls Who Code program, 95% of whom stated they desired to major in computer science in higher education. According to the organization's 2022 report, there are approximately 185,000 college or post-college age alumni who have completed the program.

In 2019, the organization announced plans to expand to 10,000 clubs in all 50 states. In 2020, Girls Who Code launched a free 2-week virtual Summer Immersion Program in response to the COVID-19 pandemic, with the program serving 5,000 girls in its first year.

The organization is sponsored by several software and technology companies, including AOL, Google, and Microsoft, and in August 2014 received a $1 million contribution from AT&T.

== Expansion in USA ==
Girls Who Code announced that in 2016 the nonprofit organization would be expanding to all 50 states. In August 2017, they launched a successful series of 13 books, including a nonfiction book, Girls Who Code: Learn to Code and Change the World, and several fiction books. By the spring of 2018, Girls Who Code reached more than 50,000 girls with their computer science education programs.

As of February 2021, Girls Who Code had more than 80,000 college-aged alums who are entering the workforce. As of March 2021, Girls Who Code clubs and programs had reached more than 300,000 girls globally.

The organization's efforts to close the achievement gender gap have resulted in several honors. Saujani was recognized for her vision and efforts to close the gender gap in technology. Girls Who Code alumni include Andrea Gonzales and Sophie Houser, the creators of the video game Tampon Run.

In 2020, Girls Who Code updated its brand design in order to connect better with Generation Z. The new design is called "making waves" because it is based on the shape of formatted code. The indentations used for formatting code create a wave shape. This new brand update involved many different types of waves, a new color palette, a font change, and a single-color logo.

== Programs ==
=== Clubs ===
The Girls Who Code after-school club program is open to middle and high school girls between 13 and 18. These clubs are run by college students, teachers, librarians, or professionals in the technology industry. Club meeting times vary among clubs, but are approximately 20 weeks with 2 hour meetings per week. The club curriculum is built on four foundational computer science concepts: loops, conditionals, variables, and functions. The organization calls these the "core-four." Club activities consist of coding tutorials, pre-professional workshops, and community building events.

=== Summer Immersion Program ===
The Summer Immersion Program (SIP) was a seven-week in-person summer camp program offered for girls in tenth and eleventh grade to introduce them to the world of coding. Due to the COVID-19 pandemic, the program developed into a two-week virtual program. These summer camps are based at more than 80 technology companies across the United States, including Facebook, Twitter, Adobe, Prudential, Microsoft, and Sephora. The company at which the SIP is based also offers a mentorship program that matches girls in the camp with women in the company. The core curriculum for the program includes lessons on HTML, CSS, and JavaScript programming languages with extra material varying between program sites. The program ends with a final group project, project showcase, and graduation ceremony.

== Partnerships ==
In 2016, Girls Who Code partnered with Accenture and subsequently, released a report on recommendations to decrease the gender gap in computing.

Dell Technologies has partnered with the organization to support after school programs for young girls.

On October 11, 2018, Girls Who Code partnered with TikTok starting the hashtag #raiseyourhand. The app announced plans with a maximum of $10,000 to give US$1 for every video posted using the hashtag.

As of 2020, Girls Who Code has partnered with American Girl to create a doll representing "Courtney Moore", an avid gamer who codes her own video game. From September 2020 to December 2020, American Girl matched customer donations up to $50,000 to Girls Who Code. The organization also created four scholarships, each $5,000, for Girls Who Code members for furthering their computer science education.

In December 2021, Girls Who Code partnered with Doja Cat and Active Theory to create DojaCode, an interactive music video to the star's single 'Woman'. The interactive video introduced participants to three coding languages with which they could modify the appearance of the music video visuals.

Girls Who Code has had a partnership with weapons manufacturer Raytheon since 2018. Raytheon donated $1 million to the organization in 2021. In August 2022, they collaborated to launch Girls Who Code's Leadership Academy for college age girls.

== Campaigns ==
Girls Who Code started a digital march called the #MarchforSisterhood. This campaign called for women and allies to post themselves marching for a cause they care about. Posts involve a video or picture of participants either holding a sign that says "I march for..." with the latter half of the sentence filled in or stating who/what they march for.

For Super Bowl 2020, Girls Who Code partnered with Olay to make a Super Bowl commercial. The commercial featured Lilly Singh, Busy Philipps, Taraji P. Henson, Katie Couric, and retired astronaut Nicole Stott. The commercial was inspired by the first all-female spacewalk from October 2019. Olay donated $1 to Girls Who Code for each time #MakeSpaceForWomen was used on Twitter.

In 2020, Girls Who Code released the "Missing Code" campaign. The campaign involved a series of videos that depict applications such as Instagram and Netflix glitching out. These glitches were caused when the code written by women was removed. The purpose of the campaign was to depict what the internet would look like if all the code written by women vanished and if women were not part of the technology industry.

== International expansion ==
In November 2018, Girls Who Code expanded to Canada. This was the organization's first international expansion. With the help of Morgan Stanley and the Federation of Ontario Public Libraries, Girls Who Code has launched at least ten after-school clubs across Ontario. The expansion was announced at the Move the Dial Summit.

As of August 2022, Girls Who Code also has expanded to India in order to increase the number of women engineers in India from 26%. The organization partnered with United Technologies to offer a virtual two-week Summer Immersion Program, virtual six-week self-paced program and after school clubs.

== Books banned ==
In 2020–2021, four titles from the Girls Who Code book series, The Friendship Code, Team BFF: Race to the Finish!, Lights, Music, Code!, and Spotlight on Coding Club!, were banned from the Central York school district in Pennsylvania. The books were listed on the PEN America's Index of School Book Bans for a ten-month period from November 2020 to September 2021. The Girls Who Code books were on a resource list created by the district's diversity committee that contained other banned books, such as The Handmaid's Tale.

Saujani declared that the banning of the Girls Who Code books was linked to the Moms for Liberty group. The group has not confirmed this and the Moms for Liberty co-founder, Tina Descovich, said that the group is only concerned with banning material that would give their children easy access to sexually explicit content and pornography.

== See also ==
- Black Girls Code
- Native Girls Code
- Women Who Code
- I Look Like an Engineer
