= SonicWall =

American cybersecurity company

SonicWall Inc.
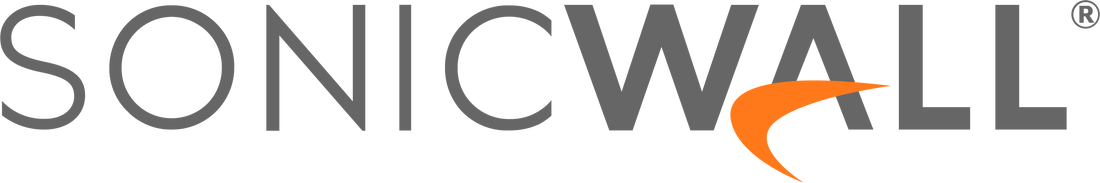
- Type: Private
- Traded as: Nasdaq: SNWL (1999–2010)
- Industry: Network security, security appliances, Internet security, WAN optimization
- Founded: August 1991; 35 years ago as Sonic Systems
- Founders: Sreekanth and Sudhakar Ravi
- Headquarters: Milpitas, California, U.S.
- Key people: Bob VanKirk (president & CEO); Bill Conner (executive chairman of the board)
- Products: Next-generation firewall; UTM; firewalls; virtual firewall; VPN; wireless security; SD-WAN; zero-trust security; security appliance filtering spam, spyware, viruses and other malware
- Owners: Francisco Partners (2016–present); Elliott Management (2016–present)
- Number of employees: 1,000 - 5,000
- Parent: Dell (2012–2016)
- Website: www.sonicwall.com

SonicWall Inc. is an American cybersecurity company that sells a range of Internet appliances primarily directed at content control and network security. These include devices providing services for network firewalls, unified threat management (UTM), virtual private networks (VPNs), virtual firewalls, SD-WAN, cloud security and anti-spam for email. The company also markets information subscription services related to its products. The company also assists in solving problems surrounding compliance with the Health Insurance Portability and Accountability Act (HIPAA) and the Payment Card Industry Data Security Standard (PCI-DSS).

Originally a private company headquartered in Silicon Valley, it went public in 1999, before delisting in 2010. On March 13, 2012, USA Today said that Dell had announced its intent to acquire SonicWall, which then had 130 patents and 950 employees. Dell's acquisition of SonicWall became official on May 9, 2012.

On June 20, 2016, Dell sold SonicWall (part of its Dell Software division) to private equity firms Francisco Partners and Elliott Management.

== History ==
In 1991, brothers Sreekanth Ravi and Sudhakar Ravi founded the company under the name Sonic Systems to develop Ethernet and Fast Ethernet cards, hubs and bridges for the Apple market.

In the late 1990s, the company released a security product initially called Interpol and later branded SonicWALL, a dedicated hardware appliance with firewall and VPN software intended for the small-business market. As sales for security appliances rapidly accelerated, the company exited the Apple add-on networking business and refocused exclusively as a network security company.

In late 1999, the company changed its name from Sonic Systems to SonicWALL, Inc. to represent the shift to network security, and in November 1999 SonicWall went public on the Nasdaq with the symbol SNWL.

In 2001, SonicWall upgraded its Global Management System (GMS) software to manage more VPN devices.

Matthew T. Medeiros (formerly of Philips Components) became CEO in March 2003. SonicWall has acquired several companies during its existence, often expanding its product line in the process. In 2005, SonicWall acquired enKoo and Lasso Logic, and in 2007 acquired Aventail Corporation.

On July 23, 2010, SonicWall completed its merger with affiliates of an investor group led by Thoma Bravo, which included the Ontario Teachers' Pension Plan, through its private investor department, Teachers' Private Capital. After the merger, SonicWall was delisted from Nasdaq.

On March 13, 2012, Dell signed a definitive agreement to acquire SonicWall.

On May 20, 2016, Dell sold Dell Software, which included SonicWall, to private equity firms Francisco Partners and Elliott Management.

In March 2021, the SonicWall SecureFirst partner program received a five-star rating in the 2021 CRN Partner Program Guide.

On January 22, 2021, SonicWall said it was attacked by "highly sophisticated threat actors" in a potential zero-day attack on certain SonicWall secure remote access products. On January 25, former lulzsec hacker Darren Martyn announced exploits against old VPN vulnerabilities. These exploits and the January 2021 attack were unrelated; SonicWall confirmed that the Martyn exploits were patched in 2015.

On January 7, 2022, SonicWall said that some of its email security and firewall products were hit by the Y2k22 bug, and released patches after a few days.

On July 21, 2022, former president and CEO Bill Conner took on the role of Executive Chairman of the Board. Former SonicWall Chief Revenue Officer Bob VanKirk was named president and CEO.

== 2026 zero-day vulnerabilities ==
In July 2026, SonicWall disclosed that attackers had exploited zero-day vulnerabilities in its SMA1000 remote-access appliances. The attackers deployed custom KnuckleBall malware and related tools, dating back to June 22nd. In response, SonicWall issued fixes and CISA added both flaws to its public warning list. In August, researchers reported that several groups continued targeting vulnerable appliances, with the INC ransomware group responsible for most of the recent activity.
