= OneLogin =

Cloud-based management provider

- Type: Private company
- Industry: Cloud computing
- Founded: 2009; 17 years ago
- Founders: Thomas Pedersen; Christian Pedersen
- Headquarters: San Francisco, California
- Revenue: ▲$23.7 million(2023)
- Number of employees: 200(2023)
- Website: www.onelogin.com

OneLogin, Inc. is a cloud-based identity and access management (IAM) provider that develops a unified access management (UAM) platform for enterprise-level businesses and organizations.

== History ==
OneLogin was founded in 2009 in San Francisco by Thomas and Christian Pedersen. The brothers were previously involved with the help desk application Zendesk before launching OneLogin. The service officially launched in 2010.

In December 2015, the company acquired San Diego–based Cafésoft, a provider of on-premise web access management (WAM) software.

In June 2016, OneLogin acquired a cloud-based password management tool known as Portadi. Later, in November 2016, OneLogin acquired a software vendor with container technology, that runs on mobile devices, as well as an account takeover detection company in 2017.

OneLogin was acquired on October 4, 2021, by One Identity.

== Security breaches ==
In August 2016, OneLogin reported that "an unauthorized user gained access to one of our standalone systems, which we use for log storage and analytics." The single user accessed the service for a month or more and may have been able to see Secure Notes unencrypted. In response, OneLogin fixed the cleartext logging bug.

On May 31, 2017, OneLogin detected and stopped unauthorized access in their US data region.

== See also ==
- List of single sign-on implementations
