= List of mergers and acquisitions by Dell =

Dell logo

This list of Dell ownership activities delineates mergers, acquisitions, divestitures, and stakes of Dell.

== Acquisitions and mergers ==
	Date	Company	Industry	Country	Transaction value	Transaction adjusted	References
1	September 8, 1999	ConvergeNet Technologies	Data storage	United States	$340,688,000	$658,000,000	
2	September 30, 1999	NetSage	Software	United States	$10,000,000	$19,000,000	
3	May 31, 2002	Plural	IT services provider	United States	—	—	
4	May 8, 2006	Alienware	Computer desktops	United States	—	—	
5	November 14, 2006	ACS	Information technology	United Kingdom	—	—	
6	July 18, 2007	SilverBack Technologies, Inc. (Note: Dell Inc. acquired SilverBack Technologies, Inc. .)	Network monitoring	United States	—	—	
7	November 12, 2007	ASAP Software Express (Note: ASAP Software Express was acquired from Corporate Express.)	Information technology	United States	$340,000,000	$528,000,000	
8	December 20, 2007	Everdream	Software	United States	—	—	
9	January 28, 2008	EqualLogic	Storage area networks	United States	$1.4×10^{9}	$2.094×10^{9}	
10	February 21, 2008	The Networked Storage Company	Information provider	United Kingdom	—	—	
11	April 24, 2008	MessageOne	Office software management	United States	$155,000,000	$232,000,000	
12	September 21, 2009	Perot Systems	IT services provider	United States	$3.9×10^{9}	$5.853×10^{9}	
13	February 11, 2010	KACE Networks	Appliance-based systems management provider	United States	—	—	
14	February 19, 2010	Exanet	OEM NAS software provider	Israel	$12,000,000	$18,000,000	
15	July 1, 2010	Scalent	Data center management vendor	United States	—	—	
16	July 30, 2010	Ocarina Networks	Storage deduplication vendor	United States	—	—	
17	November 2, 2010	Boomi	Cloud integration vendor	United States	—	—	
18	December 13, 2010	Compellent	Storage systems manufacturer	United States	$960,000,000	$1.417×10^{9}	
19	January 4, 2011	SecureWorks	Security services	United States	$612,000,000	$876,000,000	
20	June 21, 2011	RNA Networks	Software networking	United States	undisclosed	undisclosed	
21	July 20, 2011	Force10	Data center Ethernet switches	United States	$700,000,000	$1.002×10^{9}	
22	April 5, 2012	Make Technologies	Services modernization	United States	undisclosed	undisclosed	
23	April 3, 2012	Clerity Systems	Services modernization	United States	undisclosed	undisclosed	
24	April 2, 2012	Wyse Technology	Cloud technology	United States	undisclosed	undisclosed	
25	April 2012	SonicWALL, Inc.	Software security	United States	undisclosed	undisclosed	
26	April 2012	AppAssure	Software security	United States	undisclosed	undisclosed	
27	July 2, 2012	Quest Software	Systems management and security software	United States	$2.4×10^{9}	$3.366×10^{9}	
28	November 16, 2012	Gale Technologies	Infrastructure automation solutions	United States	undisclosed	undisclosed	References
29	May 6, 2013	Enstratius, formerly enStratus Networks	Cloud management software	United States	$3,500,000	$5,000,000	
30	March 24, 2014	StatSoft	Statistical software and services	United States	undisclosed	undisclosed	
31	October 12, 2015	EMC²	Storage, virtualization, services, cloud, data center, security and compliance	United States	$67,000,000,000	$9.1004×10^{10}	
32	January 23, 2023	Cloudify	Cloud management and Orchestration Software as a service	United States	$100,000,000	$106,000,000	
33	August 11, 2023	Moogsoft	AI powered DevOps and ITOps	United States	undisclosed	undisclosed	

== Stakes ==
Date	Company	Business	Country	Value (USD)	Adjusted (USD)	References
June 8, 1999	NaviSite (Note: Dell acquired a 4.9% interest in NaviSite.)	Internet service provider	United States	—	—	
July 21, 1999	Com2001.com	Internet community software	United States	—	—	
January 31, 2000	Fast Search & Transfer	Enterprise search	Norway	$25,200,000	$47,000,000	
June 16, 2000	Netyear Group	Consulting	Japan	—	—	

== Divestitures ==
Date	Acquirer	Target company	Target business	Acquirer country	Value (USD)	Adjusted (USD)	References
October 9, 2000	Finali	NetSage	Help software	United States	—	—	
October 16, 2008	Stream Global Services	Contact Centre-San Salvador	Manufacturing	United States	—	—	
November 2, 2016	NTT Data	Dell Services/Perot Systems	IT service provider	Japan	3,100,000,000	4.159×10^{9}	
