= Dell Software =

Former software division of Dell, Inc.

Dell Software, Inc.
- The Dell logo, 2011-2016
- Type: Private
- Industry: Manufacturing; Software; IT services
- Defunct: November 1, 2016
- Fate: Sold to private equity
- Successor: Quest Software and Sonicwall
- Headquarters: Round Rock, Texas, United States
- Area served: Worldwide
- Key people: John Swainson, President
- Products: Systems Management; Network Security; Identity Management; Database; Information Management; Big Data; Business intelligence; BYOD; Backup; Disaster Recovery; System Monitoring; Windows Server Management & Migration; Enterprise Software; Business software; Software
- Owner: Michael Dell; Silver Lake Partners
- Website: software.dell.com

Dell Software was a former division of Dell with headquarters in Round Rock, Texas, United States. Dell Software was created by merging various acquisitions (mainly Quest Software and Sonicwall) by Dell Inc., the third-largest maker of PCs and now a privately held company, to build out its software offerings for data center and cloud management, information management, mobile workforce management, security and data protection for organizations of all sizes.

== History ==
Dell Inc. formed the Dell Software group in February 2012, after a series of 37 acquisitions strengthened the company’s focus on software and services. The new group helped unify the acquisitions, which included the following companies, among others:

- KACE Networks, specializing in computer appliances for IT systems management and software for security, application virtualization and systems management products. KACE specialize in software inventory and distribution, operating system deployment, and mobile device management. On February 10, 2010, Dell acquired KACE Networks, a leader in systems management appliances. The terms of the deal were not disclosed.
- Boomi, makers of AtomSphere, on-demand integration technology that uses pure SaaS technology to connect any combination of SaaS, cloud and on-premises applications without needing to install and maintain integration software or appliances. On November 2, 2010, Dell acquired Software-as-a-Service (SaaS) integration leader Boomi. Terms of the deal were not disclosed.
- AppAssure Software, which developed a series of backup tools for Windows and Linux servers. AppAssure provides global deduplication, overall reduced recovery time, enhanced scalability, and granular object-level recovery for both files and application-level objects, such as emails. On February 24, 2012 Dell acquired backup and disaster recovery software tool provider AppAssure Software of Reston, VA. AppAssure delivered 194 percent revenue growth in 2011 and over 3500% growth in the prior three years. AppAssure supports physical servers and VMware, Hyper-V and XenServer. The deal represents the first acquisition since Dell formed its software division under former CA CEO John Swainson. Dell added that it will keep AppAssure’s 230 employees and invest in the company.
- SonicWALL, creators of various internet appliances primarily directed at content control and network security. Applications include devices and services for managing network firewalls, unified threat management (UTM), virtual private networks (VPN), backup and recovery, and anti spam systems for email. In March 2012, USA Today said that Dell agreed to buy SonicWall, and the acquisition was completed 9 May 2012. A company with 130 patents, SonicWall develops security products, and is a network and data security provider.
- Quest Software, the makers of Toad (software), a productivity tool used by millions of database professionals. Quest also produced products that help develop, manage, monitor and protect packaged and custom software applications. On July 2, 2012, Dell announced that it was buying Quest Software. The acquisition was completed on 28 September 2012.
- Enstratius, providers of a cloud-computing infrastructure-management platform that addresses governance issues associated with deploying systems in public, private and hybrid clouds. More than 20 public and private clouds are supported, as well as configuration management tools such as Chef and Puppet. The Enstratius platform supports both SaaS and on-premises deployment models.
- StatSoft, a provider of advanced analytics tools that help organizations better understand their business, predict change, increase agility and control critical systems. With capabilities for data mining, predictive analytics, desktop data modeling, and data visualization, StatSoft enables users to forecast trends, identify sales opportunities, explore “what-if” scenarios, and reduce the occurrence of fraud and other business risks. StatSoft was founded in 1984, and was acquired by Dell in March 2014. Terms of the transaction were not disclosed.

On March 5, 2012, John Swainson became president of Dell Software. Previously, Swainson was Senior Advisor to Silver Lake Partners, a global private equity firm. Prior to Silver Lake, he was CEO and director of CA Inc., from early 2005 through 2009. The purpose of forming the new group was to build on Dell’s software capabilities and provide research and organizational support for achieving Michael Dell’s vision of delivering end-to-end IT solutions to customers.

On June 20, 2016, Dell Software announced an agreement to be purchased by private equity firm Francisco Partners and hedge fund manager Elliott Management.

On November 1, 2016, the sale of Dell Software to Francisco Partners and Elliott Management was completed and the company relaunched as Quest Software. While legally named Quest Software, it is known in the marketplace as Quest. Quest is an IT software tool provider with a focus on enabling innovation with less administration. Quest products are built from unique IP by in-house engineers, guided by a community of users, and backed by a global support team.

== Solutions ==
Dell Software offered end-to-end solutions to address challenges in several business and technology areas, including six key ones:

- Data Protection
- Endpoint Management
- Identity and Access Management
- Information Management
- Network Security
- Windows Server Management and Migration

Data protection software and deduplication appliances offer customized backup, replication and recovery systems for physical, virtual, application and cloud environments. The solutions provide management tools for enterprise backup and recovery, virtual protection, application-specific data protection, and disaster recovery for uninterrupted productivity. They also help organizations prevent intrusions, block malware and gather application intelligence.

Endpoint management solutions simplify management of a diverse array of endpoint systems and devices, including desktops, laptops, servers, Chromebooks, mobile devices, virtual workspaces and network-connected non-computing devices. The solutions allow organizations to deploy systems, conduct asset inventory, automate operating system and application patch management, and manage software updates.

Identity and access management solutions allow organizations to govern identities, manage privileged accounts, and control access. They help organizations achieve identity, data, and privileged access governance, simplify secure access management for users and groups, and enable control and audit administrative access through secure, automated, policy-based workflows.

Information management solutions simplify data access, analysis and management. They integrate with most legacy systems and enable organizations to manage complex and big data, ensure data accuracy, integrate applications and data across on-site and cloud environments, streamline business intelligence, and automate development and database management tasks.

Network security solutions provide intrusion prevention, malware protection, application intelligence and control, real-time traffic visualization, and inspection for Secure Sockets Layer (SSL)–encrypted sessions at the gateway. They also enable organizations to manage, visualize, analyze, audit and report across numerous appliances deployed at remote sites through a centralized console.

Windows Server management and migration solutions automate administrative functions for Active Directory, Exchange, Lync, SharePoint, Office 365 and other Microsoft platforms. These solutions enable organizations to migrate, consolidate and restructure mission-critical application environments, customize Windows platforms, and manage IT governance, risk and compliance of Windows environments.
