= Transcranial Doppler =

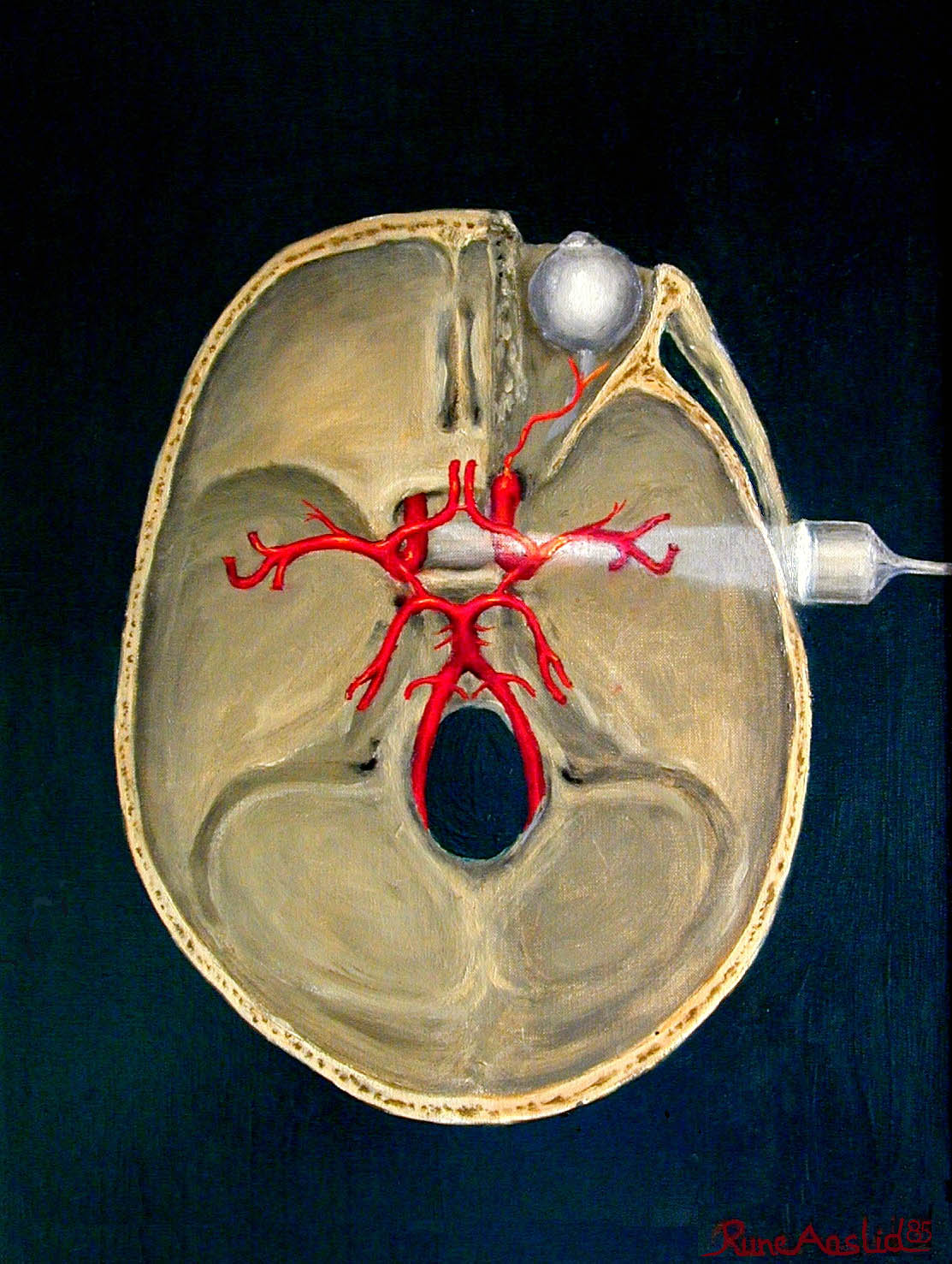
- Transcranial Doppler insonation of the cerebral circulation
- Synonyms: Transcranial color Doppler
- ICD-9-CM: 88.71
- MeSH: D017585
- LOINC: 24733-8, 39044-3, 30880-9

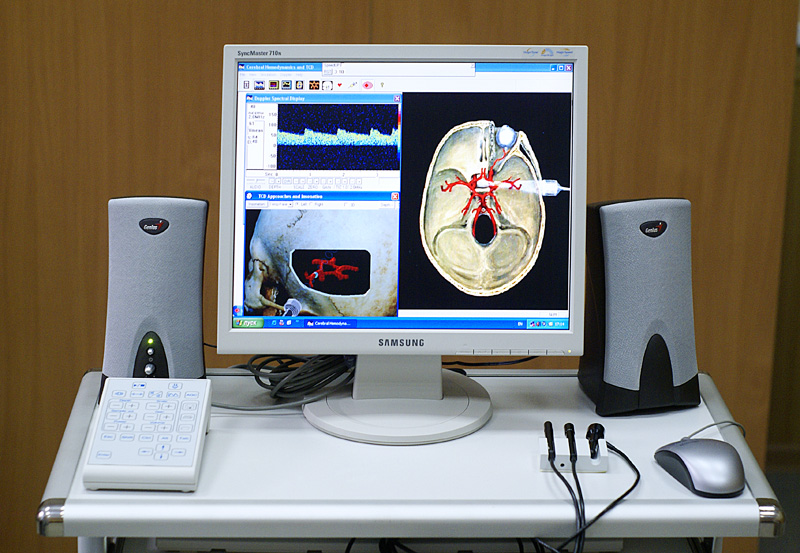
Transcranial doppler ultrasound analyzer of blood velocity

Transcranial Doppler (TCD) and transcranial color Doppler (TCCD) are types of Doppler ultrasonography that measure the velocity of blood flow through the brain's blood vessels by measuring the echoes of ultrasound waves moving transcranially (through the cranium). These modes of medical imaging conduct a spectral analysis of the acoustic signals they receive and can therefore be classified as methods of active acoustocerebrography. They are used as tests to help diagnose emboli, stenosis, vasospasm from a subarachnoid hemorrhage (bleeding from a ruptured aneurysm), and other problems. These relatively quick and inexpensive tests are growing in popularity. The tests are effective for detecting sickle cell disease, ischemic cerebrovascular disease, subarachnoid hemorrhage, arteriovenous malformations, and cerebral circulatory arrest. The tests are possibly useful for perioperative monitoring and meningeal infection. The equipment used for these tests is becoming increasingly portable, making it possible for a clinician to travel to a hospital, to a doctor's office, or to a nursing home for both inpatient and outpatient studies. The tests are often used in conjunction with other tests such as MRI, MRA, carotid duplex ultrasound and CT scans. The tests are also used for research in cognitive neuroscience (see Functional transcranial Doppler, below).

== Methods ==
Two methods of recording may be used for this procedure. The first uses "B-mode" imaging, which displays a 2-dimensional image of the skull, brain, and blood vessels as seen by the ultrasound probe. Once the desired blood vessel is found, blood flow velocities may be measured with a pulsed Doppler effect probe, which graphs velocities over time. Together, these make a duplex test. The second method of recording uses only the second probe function, relying instead on the training and experience of the clinician in finding the correct vessels. Current TCD machines always allow both methods.

== How it works ==
The ultrasound probe emits a high-frequency sound wave (usually a multiple of 2 MHz) that bounces off various substances in the body. These echoes are detected by a sensor in the probe. In the case of blood in an artery, the echoes have different frequencies depending on the direction and speed of the blood because of the Doppler effect. If the blood is moving away from the probe, then the frequency of the echo is lower than the emitted frequency; if the blood is moving towards the probe, then the frequency of the echo is higher than the emitted frequency. The echoes are analysed and converted into velocities that are displayed on the unit's computer monitor. In fact, because the probe is pulsed at a rate of up to 10 kHz, the frequency information is discarded from each pulse and reconstructed from phase changes from one pulse to the next.

Because the bones of the skull block most of the transmission of ultrasound, regions with thinner walls (called insonation windows), which offer the least distortion to the sound waves, must be used for analyzing. For this reason, recording is performed in the temporal region above the cheekbone/zygomatic arch, through the eyes, below the jaw, and from the back of the head. Patient age, sex, race, and other factors affect bone thickness and porosity, making some examinations more difficult or even impossible. Most can still be performed to obtain acceptable responses, sometimes requiring using alternative sites from which to view the vessels.

== Implantable transcranial Doppler ==
Sometimes a patient's history and clinical signs suggest a very high risk of stroke. Occlusive stroke causes permanent tissue damage over the following three hours (maybe even 4.5 hours), but not instantly. Various drugs (e.g. aspirin, streptokinase, and tissue plasminogen activator (TPA) in ascending order of effectiveness and cost) can reverse the stroke process. The problem is how to know immediately that a stroke is happening. One possible way is the use of an implantable transcranial Doppler device "operatively connected to a drug delivery system". Battery-powered, it would use an RF link to a portable computer running a spectral analysis routine together with input from an oximeter (monitoring the degree of blood oxygenation, which a stroke might impair) to make the automatic decision to administer the drug.

== Functional transcranial Doppler (fTCD) ==
Functional transcranial Doppler sonography (fTCD) is a neuroimaging tool for measuring cerebral blood flow velocity changes due to neural activation during cognitive tasks. Functional TCD uses pulse-wave Doppler technology to record blood flow velocities in the anterior, middle, and posterior cerebral arteries. Similar to other neuroimaging techniques such as functional magnetic resonance imaging (fMRI) and positron emission tomography (PET), fTCD is based on a close coupling between regional cerebral blood flow changes and neural activation. Due to a continuous monitoring of blood flow velocity, TCD offers better temporal resolution than fMRI and PET. The technique is noninvasive and easy to apply. Blood flow velocity measurements are robust against movement artifacts. Since its introduction the technique has contributed substantially to the elucidation of the hemispheric organization of cognitive, motor, and sensory functions in adults and children. fTCD has been used to study cerebral lateralization of major brain functions such as language, face processing, color processing, and intelligence. Moreover, most established neuroanatomical substrates for brain function are perfused by the major cerebral arteries that could be directly insonated. Lastly, fTCD has been used as a brain–computer interface modality.

=== Functional transcranial Doppler spectroscopy (fTCDS) ===
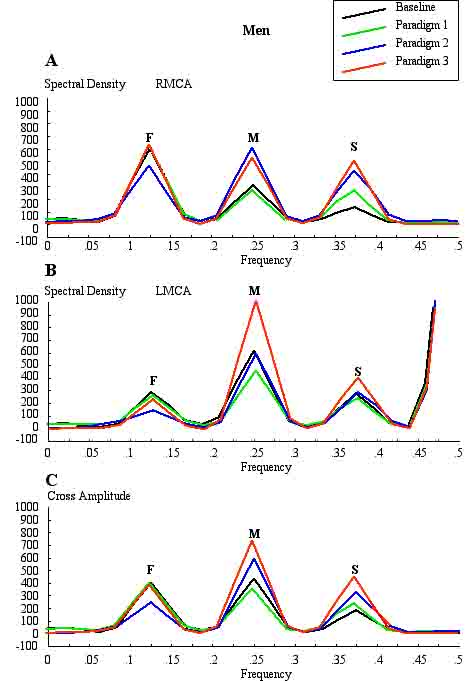
Spectral density plots right and left middle cerebral arteries cross-amplitude plots in men.

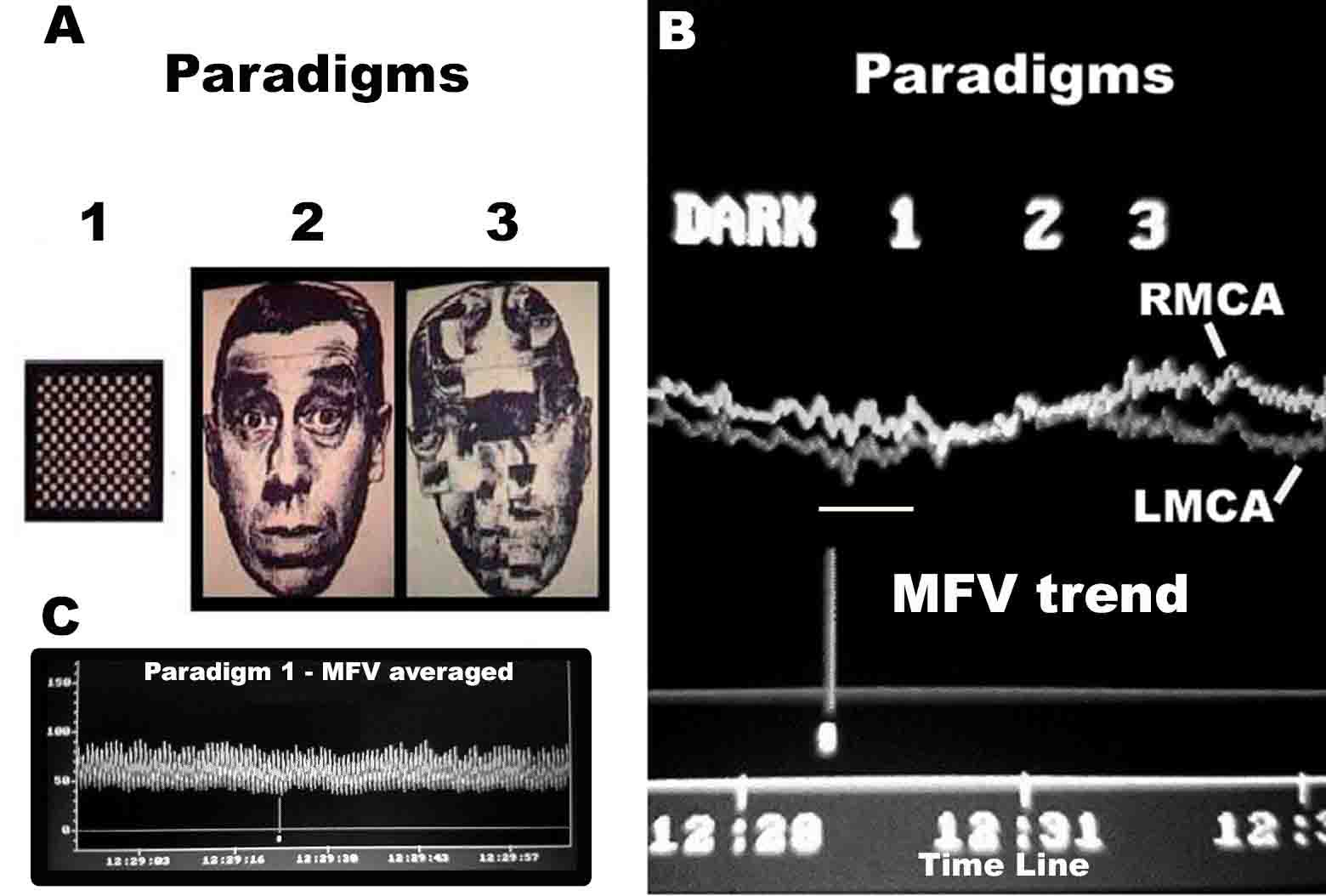
Facial Paradigms

Conventional FTCD has limitations for the study of cerebral lateralization. For example, it may not differentiate the lateralising effects due to stimulus characteristics from those due to light responsiveness, and does not distinguish between flow signals emanating from cortical and subcortical branches of the cerebral arteries of the circle of Willis. Each basal cerebral artery of the circle of Willis gives origin to two different systems of secondary vessels. The shorter of these two is called the ganglionic system, and the vessels belonging to it supply the thalami and corpora striata; the longer is the cortical system, and its vessels ramify in the pia mater and supply the cortex and subjacent brain substance. Furthermore, the cortical branches are divisible into two classes: long and short. The long or medullary arteries pass through the grey substance and penetrate the subjacent white substance to the depth of 3–4 cm. The short vessels are confined to the cortex. Both cortical and ganglionic systems do not communicate at any point in their peripheral distribution, but are entirely independent of each other, having between the parts supplied by the two systems, a borderline of diminished nutritive activity. While, the vessels of the ganglionic system are terminal vessels, the vessels of the cortical arterial system are not so strictly "terminal". Blood flow in these two systems in the middle cerebral artery (MCA) territory supplies 80% of both hemispheres, including most neural substrates implicated in facial processing, language processing and intelligence processing at cortical and subcortical structures. The measurements of mean blood flow velocity (MFV) in the MCA main stem could potentially provide information about downstream changes at cortical and subcortical sites within the MCA territory. Each distal arm of the MCA vascular system could be separated into "near" and "far" distal reflection sites for the cortical and ganglionic (subcortical) systems, respectively. To accomplish this objective, one method is to apply Fourier analysis to the periodic time series of MFV acquired during cognitive stimulations. Fourier analysis would yield peaks representing pulsatile energy from reflection sites at various harmonics, which are multiples of the fundamental frequency. McDonald in 1974 showed that the first five harmonics usually contain 90% of the entire pulsatile energy within the system of pressure/flow oscillations in the peripheral circulation. It could be presumed that each arm of the vascular system represents a single viscoelastic tube terminated by impedance, creating a single reflection site. Psychophysiologic stimulation induced vasomotor activity at each terminal site sets up a standing sinusoidal wave oscillation, comprising a summation of waves due to effects of incident, reflected, and re-reflected waves from distal to proximal point of measurement. fTCDS studies are performed with the participant placed in a supine posture with their head up at about 30 degrees. The probe holder headgear (e.g. LAM-RAK, DWL, Sipplingen, Germany) are used with a base support on two earplugs and on the nasal ridge. Two 2-MHz probes are affixed in the probe holder and insonation performed to determine the optimal position for continuous monitoring of both MCA main stems at 50 mm depth from the surface of the probe. A serial recording of MFV for each stimulus is acquired and latter used for Fourier analysis. Fourier transform algorithm uses standard software (for example, Time series and forecasting module, STATISTICA, StatSoft, Inc.). The most efficient standard Fourier algorithm requires that the length of the input series is equal to a power of 2. If this is not the case, additional computations have to be performed. To derive the required time series, the data were averaged in 10-second segments for 1-minute duration or each stimulus, yielding 6 data points for each participant and a total of 48 data points for all eight men and women, respectively. Smoothing the periodogram values was accomplished using a weighted moving average transformation. Hamming window was applied as a smoother. The spectral density estimates, derived from single series Fourier analysis, were plotted, and the frequency regions with the highest estimates were marked as peaks. The origins of the peaks are of interest in order to determine the reliability of the present technique. The fundamental (F), cortical (C) or memory (M), and subcortical (S) peaks occurred at regular frequency intervals of 0.125, 0.25, and 0.375, respectively. These frequencies could be converted to Hz, assuming that the fundamental frequency of cardiac oscillation was the mean heart rate. The fundamental frequency (F) of the first harmonic could be determined from the mean heart rate per second. For example, a heart rate of 74 bpm, suggests 74 cycles/60 or 1.23 Hz. In other words, the F-, C-, and S-peaks occurred at multiples of the first harmonic, at second and third harmonics, respectively. The distance of the reflection site for F-peak could be presumed to emanate from a site at D_{1} = wavelength/4 = cf/4 = 6.15 (m/s)/(4×1.23 Hz) = 125 cm, where c is the assumed wave propagation velocity of the peripheral arterial tree according to McDonald, 1974. Given the vascular tortuosity, the estimated distance approximates that from the measurement site in the MCA main stem, to an imaginary site of summed reflections from the upper extremities, close to the finger tips when stretched sideways. The C-peak occurred at the second harmonic, such that the estimated arterial length (using common carotid c = 5.5 m/s) was given by D_{2} = wavelength/8 = cf_{2}/8 = 28 cm, and a frequency f of 2.46 Hz. The distance approximates the visible arterial length from the main stem of the MCA, through vascular tortuosity and around the cerebral convexity, to the end vessels at distal cortical sites such as the occipito-temporal junction on carotid angiograms of adults. The S-peak occurred at the third harmonic, and may have arisen from an estimated site at D_{3}= wavelength/16 = cf_{3}/16 = 9.3 cm and a frequency f_{3} of 3.69 Hz. The latter approximates the visible arterial length of the lenticulostriate vessels from the main stem of the MCA on carotid angiograms. Although not displayed, the fourth harmonic would be expected to arise from the MCA bifurcation in closest proximity to the measurement site in the main stem of the MCA. The pre-bifurcation length from the measurement point would be given by D_{4} = wavelength/32 = cf_{4}/32 = 3.5 cm and a frequency f_{4} of 4.92 Hz. The calculated distance approximates that of the segment of MCA main stem just after the carotid bifurcation, where probably the ultrasound sample volume was placed, to the MCA bifurcation. Thus, these estimates approximate actual lengths. However, it has been suggested that the estimated distances may not correlate exactly with known morphometric dimensions of the arterial tree according to Campbell et al., 1989. The method was first described by Philip Njemanze in 2007, and was referred to as functional transcranial Doppler spectroscopy (fTCDS). fTCDS examines spectral density estimates of periodic processes induced during mental tasks, and hence offers a much more comprehensive picture of changes related to effects of a given mental stimulus. The spectral density estimates would be least affected by artefacts that lack periodicity, and filtering would reduce the effect of noise. The changes at the C-peak may show cortical long-term potential (CLTP) or cortical long-term depression (CLTD), which has been proposed to be suggest equivalents of cortical activity during learning and cognitive processes. The flow velocity tracings are monitored during paradigm 1 comprising a checkerboard square as object perception are compared to whole face (paradigm 2) and facial element sorting task (paradigm 3). Fast Fourier transform calculations are used to obtain the spectral density and cross amplitude plots in the left and right middle cerebral arteries. The C-peak also called memory (M-peak) cortical peak could be seen arising during paradigm 3, a facial element sorting task requiring iterative memory recall as a subject constantly spatially fits the puzzle by matching each facial element in paradigm 3 to that stored in memory (Paradigm 2) before proceeding to form the picture of the whole face.

== Accuracy ==
Although TCD is not always accurate due to the relative velocity of blood flow, it is still useful for diagnosis of arterial occlusions in patients with acute ischemic stroke, especially when using the middle cerebral artery. A research study has been performed to compare Power Motion Doppler of TCD (PMD-TCD) with CT angiography (CTA), both are valid, but PMD-TCD accuracy is not higher than 85 percent. The advantages of PMD-TCD is portability (so it can be used in the bed side or in the emergency room), subjects patients to less radiation compared to CTA (so can be repeated, if necessary for monitoring) and is less expensive than CTA or Magnetic Resonance Angiography.

== See also ==
- Carotid Doppler machine
- Arterial resistivity index
- Transcranial pulsed ultrasound
