= Mount Saint Joseph High School =

Private boys' high school in Baltimore, Maryland, United States

Location
- 4403 Frederick Avenue; Baltimore, Maryland 21229; United States; 39°16′50″N 76°41′17″W

Information
- Type: Parochial
- Motto: "Deo Optimo Maximo" (To God, the best and greatest)
- Religious affiliation: Catholic
- Denomination: Roman Catholic, Xaverian Brothers
- Patron saint: Saint Joseph
- Established: 1876
- Founder: Brother Bernadine
- Authority: Archdiocese of Baltimore
- President: Brendan T. Donohue
- Principal: Robert Peace
- Chaplain: Fr. John Bilenki
- Grades: 9–12
- Enrollment: 822 (2024-2025)
- Average class size: 20
- Student to teacher ratio: 11:1
- Campus size: medium
- Campus type: Urban
- Colors: Purple and Cream
- Slogan: Belong. Believe. Become.
- Athletics: 17 sports
- Athletics conference: Maryland Interscholastic Athletic Association (MIAA); Baltimore Catholic League (basketball only)
- Mascot: Gael
- Nickname: The Gaels
- Accreditation: Middle States Association of Colleges and Schools
- Publication: The Carpenter (Art/Literary magazine)
- Newspaper: The Quill
- Yearbook: Tower
- Endowment: $30 Million
- Tuition: $20,495
- Athletic Director: Kraig Loovis
- Website: msjnet.edu

Mount Saint Joseph's historic tower, built in 1901, seen here in 2016.

Mount Saint Joseph High School (commonly MSJ or Mount Saint Joe) is a Catholic college preparatory school and secondary school / high school for boys from ninth to twelfth grade sponsored by the Xaverian Brothers and founded in 1876. It is located within the Archdiocese of Baltimore, Maryland.

== Extracurricular activities ==
=== School colors and mascot ===
The school colors are purple and cream. The mascot of the Mount is the Gael.

=== Sports ===
Mount Saint Joseph plays most of its sports including wrestling, football, rugby, soccer, volleyball, basketball, baseball, lacrosse, ice hockey, mountain biking, swimming, water polo and tennis in the Maryland Interscholastic Athletic Association (MIAA) “A” Conference against other Catholic and private schools. The basketball team competes in both the MIAA and the Baltimore Catholic League. The most success has come from the wrestling program, whose varsity team has over 30 state championships and 9 national championships. The basketball team won the Baltimore Catholic League in 2012/13.

=== Clubs and activities ===
Mount Saint Joseph sponsors many student-inspired clubs such as chain-mail club, the Beatles club, Think Tank, the anime club, the video game club, and an It's Academic team, which won the Baltimore Catholic League in 2001 2007, 2008 and 2013. There is also a chapter of the National Honor Society, as well as an ACE Mentoring program for aspiring engineers. In recent years, the school has begun a Model United Nations team, and has participated in the National History Bee and Bowl since its inauguration in 2010, with at least one of its teams advancing to the national tournament every year. The Drama Club partners up with the local Catholic all-girls school, Mount de Sales Academy to perform two shows each year: a play in the fall and a musical in the spring.

== Notable alumni ==
- George E. Heffner – member of the Maryland House of Delegates
- Guy Wallace (1935) – radio personality
- Gordon England (1955) – United States Deputy Secretary of Defense and two-time Secretary of the Navy
- Emory Elliott (1960) – professor of American literature and advocate for expanding the literary canon to include a more diverse range of voices.
- Tom Phoebus (1960) – professional baseball player during the 1960s and 1970s
- Kurt Seibert (1974) – professional baseball player, second baseman for the Chicago Cubs
- James A. Watson (1974) – Rear Admiral James Watson, United States Coast Guard, Atlantic Area Command
- Rico Chiapparelli (1982) – American wrestler and mixed martial arts trainer, attended for 3 years before transferring to Blair Academy his senior year in 1982
- Vinny Smith (1982) – businessman, billionaire, former CEO of Quest Software, and founder of Toba Capital.
- Larry Collmus (1984) – Triple Crown races caller for NBC Sports
- Jim Schwartz (1984) – Defensive coordinator for the Cleveland Browns. Former Head Coach of the Detroit Lions (2009-2013). Won the 2018 Super Bowl as the defensive coordinator of the Philadelphia Eagles.
- Mike Brennan (1986) – professional football player, offensive tackle for the Cincinnati Bengals
- Torrey Butler (1998) – professional basketball player
- Tommy Hannan (1998) – Olympic Gold Medalist (2000 Summer Olympics)
- Michael O'Connor (1998) – Professional Athlete, former Pitcher for the Washington Nationals
- Mark Teixeira (1998) – Major League 1B, 2003-2016 for Texas Rangers and New York Yankees
- Rob Abiamiri (2000) – Professional Athlete, tight end
- Gavin Floyd (2001) – Professional Athlete, former Pitcher for several MLB teams, including the Chicago White Sox
- John Grant Jr. (2002) – Professional Lacrosse player and 2012 NLL MVP
- Steve Clevenger (2004) – Professional baseball player, former catcher for the Chicago Cubs, Baltimore Orioles, and Seattle Mariners
- Will Thomas (2004) – Helped lead George Mason Patriots basketball team to the Final Four, and currently plays for Baloncesto Málaga in Spain
- Henry Sims (2008) – Professional Athlete, former basketball center who played for Georgetown University before playing for several NBA teams, including the Philadelphia 76ers
- Kyle Fuller (2010) – Professional football player, cornerback for the Baltimore Ravens
- Jalen Robinson (2012) – Professional Soccer Player
- Jaylen Adams (2014) – Won 2022 MVP of the National Basketball League (Australia) and a member of the Sydney Kings
- Phil Booth (2014) – Professional Basketball Guard. Won 2 NCAA championships for the Villanova Wildcats. Currently plays for SIG Strasbourg
- Peter Solomon (2014) – Major League Baseball pitcher for the Pittsburgh Pirates
- Darryl Morsell (2017) – Professional Basketball Shooting guard for the Raptors 905
- Jalen Smith (2018) – Professional Basketball Center for the Chicago Bulls
- Brett St. Martin (2018) – Professional Athlete
- Aamir Hall (2020) – College football cornerback
- Marlowe Wax (2020) - Linebacker for the Los Angeles Chargers in the National Football League
- Dont'e Thornton (2021) – College football wide receiver for the Tennessee Volunteers

== See also ==
- National Catholic Educational Association
