= WSO2 =

Company providing open-source middleware

Choreo Labs (formerly WSO2)
- Type: Private
- Industry: Middleware
- Founded: August 4, 2005; 21 years ago
- Founders: Paul Fremantle; Sanjiva Weerawarana
- Headquarters: Colombo, Sri Lanka
- Number of locations: 11 (2023)
- Area served: Worldwide
- Key people: Vinny Smith (Executive Chairman); James Clark (Director)
- Owner: EQT Private Capital Asia
- Number of employees: 900+
- Website: choreolabs.com

Choreo Labs, formerly WSO2, creates open source software and shapes open standards so enterprises can build, secure, connect, run, and govern applications and agents with full control, at speed. Its composable platform is backed by a global team of experts committed to customer success. As agents move into production, the platform gives each agent the identity, policy controls, and audit trail it needs to operate safely.

The Labs name reflects the company’s focus on what comes next in terms of ambitious, continuous innovation, so anyone can adopt AI and new digital experiences with confidence.

Founded in 2005 and headquartered in Austin, Texas, the company serves more than 950 customers in over 90 countries, including banks, governments, hospitals, and telcos. Its technology has processed 60 trillion transactions and manages 2.5 billion identities. Its open source project OpenChoreo is a CNCF Sandbox project.

Choreo Labs is an EQT portfolio company.

== History ==
WSO2 was founded by Sanjiva Weerawarana, Paul Fremantle, and Davanum Srinivas in August 2005, backed by Intel Capital, Toba Capital, and Pacific Controls. Weerawarana was an IBM researcher and a founder of the Web services platform. He led the creation of IBM SOAP4J, which later became Apache SOAP, and was the architect of other notable projects. Fremantle was one of the authors of IBM's Web Services Invocation Framework and the Web Services Gateway. An Apache member since the original Apache SOAP project, Fremantle oversaw the donation of WSIF and WSDL4J to Apache and led IBM's involvement in the Axis C/C++ project.

Fremantle was WSO2's chief technology officer (CTO) from 2008-2020, and was named one of InfoWorld's Top 25 CTOs his first year in the role. Currently, Fremantle serves as a consultant for multiple technology companies, including WSO2. In 2017, Tyler Jewell took over as CEO while Weerawarana focused on the Ballerina open-source project. In 2019, Vinny Smith became the Executive Chairman. Weerawarana returned to the role of CEO in 2020.

A subsidiary, WSO2Mobile, was launched in 2013, with Harsha Purasinghe of Microimage as the CEO and co-founder. In March 2015, WSO2.Telco was launched in partnership with Malaysian telecommunications company Axiata, which held a majority stake in the venture. WSO2Mobile has since been re-absorbed into its parent company.

EQT AB's Asian private fund EQT Private Capital Asia acquired the company for over $600 million in May 2024. The acquisition was completed three months later.

In November 2026, the company announced a rebranding, changing its name to Choreo Labs.

== Financial ==
In 2006, Intel Capital invested $4 million in WSO2, and continued to invest in subsequent years. In 2010, Godel Technologies invested in WSO2 for an unspecified amount, and in 2012 the company raised a third round of $10 million. Official WSO2 records point to this being from Toba Capital, Cisco, and Intel Capital. In August 2015, a funding round led by Pacific Controls and Toba raised another $20 million. In November 2021, WSO2 obtained $90 million in financing from Goldman Sachs Asset Management Private Credit. In May 2022, WSO2 completed its Series E funding with an additional $93 million investment from Info Edge.

=== Open-source engagement ===
Historically, WSO2 has had a close connection to the Apache community, with a significant portion of their products based on or contributing to the Apache product stack. Likewise, many of WSO2's top leadership have contributed to Apache projects. In 2013, WSO2 donated its Stratos project to Apache.

WSO2 first introduced Ballerina, an open-source, general-purpose concurrent and strongly typed programming language with both textual and graphical syntaxes, optimized for integration in 2017. General availability of Ballerina 1.0 at https://ballerina.io was then announced in 2019. In a March 2023 product review, InfoWorld rated Ballerina 2201.4.0 (Swan Lake) 4 stars (out of a possible 5).

== Products ==
WSO2 provides a range of software platforms focused on API management, integration, identity and access management, agent management, and platform engineering. These offerings are intended to support organizations in modernizing existing IT systems by enabling interoperability between legacy infrastructure and cloud-based environments. The platforms facilitate the integration of disparate systems, management of digital interactions, and incremental adoption of artificial intelligence capabilities, including support for agent-based architectures.

WSO2 emphasizes the use of open-source technologies and supports multiple deployment models, including on-premises, cloud, and hybrid environments, allowing organizations to align implementations with regulatory, operational, and regional considerations such as data sovereignty and infrastructure control.

- Agent Platform - An open platform for enterprise AI agents
- API Platform - An open platform to control APIs, AI, and MCP to ship, govern, monetize APIs, AI and MCP across any cloud or gateway
- Integration platform - A platform that connects the agentic enterprise with the building of AI agents, and any type of integration with complete deployment flexibility and data sovereignty
- Identity platform - One API-first platform to orchestrate identity for humans and AI agents, securing organizations with the flexibility of open source software
- Engineering platform - An AI-native foundation for enterprise platform teams, delivering modular golden paths with built-in CI/CD automation, deep observability, and governance-by-design to accelerate developer and agent delivery

== Operations ==
As of 2023, WSO2 has offices in: Mountain View, California; Austin, Texas; London, UK; São Paulo, Brazil; Sydney, Australia; Munich, Germany; Dubai, United Arab Emirates; Mumbai, India; Singapore, and Colombo, Sri Lanka. The bulk of its research and operations are conducted from its main office in Colombo.
