= Pawel Lewicki =

Cognitive psychologist and entrepreneur

Paul Lewicki
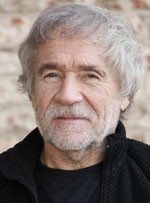
- Born: Pawel Lewicki; October 7, 1953 (age 73); Warsaw, Polish People's Republic
- Education: University of Warsaw
- Occupations: Cognitive scientist Entrepreneur; Investor
- Known for: Cognitive research on nonconscious acquisition of knowledge Founder of StatSoft

Paul Lewicki (born Pawel Lewicki; October 7, 1953) is a Polish-born American cognitive scientist, entrepreneur, and investor. He was a professor of cognitive psychology at the University of Tulsa from 1984 through 2009, where he established the Nonconscious Information Processing Laboratory, funded by NSF and NIH. After leaving the university in 2009, he assumed the full-time role of CEO of StatSoft, a multinational analytics software company that he founded and where he was a majority shareholder. On March 24, 2014, StatSoft was sold to Dell.

== Research in cognitive psychology ==
Lewicki is best known for his research on nonconscious information processing and self-perpetuation, where he demonstrated that procedural knowledge, in many cases, can be created via subconscious acquisition of information about complex covariations between events or features, and that subconsciously, individuals can acquire very complex knowledge structures based on highly-multidimensional patterns of data.

Lewicki's research on the self-perpetuating development of encoding dispositions purports to show that accidentally acquired (and even very slight) cognitive preferences or other encoding/interpretive dispositions can gradually develop and strengthen in a self-perpetuating manner. This mechanism may contribute to the development of personality traits and individual preferences; it may facilitate learning; but it can also lead to self-perpetuating development of dysfunctional biases, phobias, aversions and other symptoms of personality disorders.

== Cognitive mining versus predictive data mining ==
Lewicki together with fellow cognitive researcher Thomas Hill were among the first to publish evidence that advanced expertise acquired by humans via experience, involves the acquisition (learning) and utilization of repeatable patterns in data that are structurally more complex than what humans can verbalize or intuitively experience, because they involve high-order interactions between multiple variables. The human consciousness usually cannot handle more than only third-order interactions.

This approach became popular and rapidly adopted by the corporate world as so-called “predictive data mining” starting in the late 1990s and StatSoft’s STATISTICA Data Miner is now one of the widely used enterprise-level software systems for data mining and predictive analytics.

Lewicki began to write data analysis software for personal computers even before PCs became powerful enough to handle computationally-intensive procedures such as data mining. He found the mainframe data analysis software difficult to use and needed a tool to analyze his research data. He gave this software away for free to colleagues, who provided positive feedback and this led him to incorporate StatSoft. StatSoft then expanded into enterprise-scale predictive analytics software and, according to the company website, is now an international analytic solution software provider with more than 1,000,000 users and 30 offices worldwide.

== StatSoft ==
Lewicki was the Chief Executive Officer and President of StatSoft; on March 24, 2014, StatSoft was acquired by Dell.

In a recent interview, Lewicki emphasized that StatSoft’s corporate culture remains focused on long-term research and altruism rather than profits: "Our mission is to create value and to make the world a better place, and analytics contribute directly to that. Our employees' biggest reward is to see that what we're doing works and is making a difference."

Lewicki is the co-author (with Thomas Hill) of Statistics: Methods and Applications (also freely available in electronic format as the StatSoft Electronic Statistics Textbook), a popular resource on statistics and predictive modeling on the web with over 375,000 links from other websites worldwide (according to Google Analytics).

At StatSoft, Lewicki (with Thomas Hill) also directed research sponsored by the Electric Power Research Institute of Palo Alto (EPRI), to demonstrate the effectiveness of pattern recognition and predictive modeling algorithms for the optimization of combustion processes, to reduce harmful emissions from fossil fuel plants. The results of this research were published as EPRI Report number 1016494, and were also presented at the 2008 Meeting of the Asia-Pacific Partnership on Clean Development and Climate. Lewicki has communicated to EPRI that because of the relevance of this work for environmentally sustainable power generation, this technology will be released to the public domain as soon as the proper regulatory infrastructure is established by the EPA and DOE.

== Involvement in European economies ==
In the fall of 2012, Lewicki led the “Free Enterprise Software for Struggling European Economies” initiative, where StatSoft was installing free enterprise systems to companies in Greece, Portugal, and Spain to boost their productivity and competitiveness, and to facilitate their recovery. Lewicki has directed an open letter to fellow CEOs of US software companies urging them to join the initiative.

== Artificial intelligence in medicine ==
After the sale of StatSoft to Dell in 2014, Lewicki focused on applications of artificial intelligence in medicine, that has been traditionally slower in adopting big data learning and data mining, and he co-founded Holo Surgical Inc., a company that developed technology based on Artificial Intelligence and Augmented Reality to provide surgeons and later robots with synthetic vision. This AI-based technology is intended to support digital surgery by allowing surgeons to see internal organs without making incisions as if the patient had no skin, muscles, or connective tissue and thus to perform complex surgeries using minimally invasive techniques. Lewicki was the President and a major shareholder of Holo Surgical Inc. until 2020 when it was acquired by Surgalign Holdings Inc. (Nasdaq: SRGA). Lewicki joined the Board of Directors of Surgalign in 2020.

In 2016, Lewicki co-founded Interneural Networks Inc. (a company that specializes in Artificial Intelligence and Big Data Learning analysis of MRI brain imaging), and Kardiolytics (a company that developed AI-based, non-invasive heart-diagnostics methods). Kardiolytics uses non-invasive, AI-based analysis of inexpensive and widely available CT-scans to produce in depth heart diagnostics, with the goal of providing these methods remotely to a large percentage of the world population that currently have no access to advanced medical procedures.

In 2017, Lewicki co-founded Dystrogen Therapeutics Inc. a company that develops treatments for rare diseases such as Duchenne Muscular Dystrophy and Huntington Disease based on high-tech therapies using chimeric cells and RNAi platforms.

== Personal life ==
Lewicki is a jet-rated Airline Transport Pilot, he is also an avid scuba diver, horse rider, and a skier.
