= Exploring Tomorrow =

Exploring Tomorrow is an American old-time radio series which ran on the Mutual Broadcasting System from December 4, 1957, until June 13, 1958. An advertisement described it as "the first science-fiction show of science-fictioneers, by science-fictioneers and for science-fictioneers - real science fiction for a change!"

Exploring Tomorrow was narrated by John W. Campbell, editor of Astounding Magazine. Campbell guided the career of many of the great science fiction writers of the era.

== Personnel ==
- Producer-director: Sanford Marshall.
- Announcer: Bill Mahr, Guy Wallace
- Cast: Mandel Kramer, Bryna Raeburn, Lawson Zerbe, Lon Clark, Mason Adams, Connie Lembcke, Larry Haines, Don Douglas, Bret Morrison, Charlotte Sheffield
- Closing theme: As Time Goes By
- Writers: Randall Garrett, Gordon R. Dickson, Robert Silverberg, Isaac Asimov, Philip K. Dick, Poul Anderson, John Fleming, Raymond E. Banks, George O. Smith, Tom Godwin
