= Quest KACE =

American computer appliance manufacturer

- Type: Subsidiary
- Industry: Software
- Founded: February 2003; 23 years ago
- Founders: Rob Meinhardt and Marty Kacin
- Headquarters: Aliso Viejo, California, United States
- Products: Systems management, System deployment, KaaS, KACE Go App, KACE Express
- Parent: Quest Software
- Website: quest.com/kace

Quest KACE, formerly Dell KACE, is a company that specializes in computer appliances for systems management of information technology equipment. It also provides software for security, application virtualization, and systems management products. Established in 2003, KACE was headquartered in Mountain View, California with offices in Europe and Asia.

== History ==
KACE started in 2003 when Rob Meinhardt and Marty Kacin founded and self-funded the company for over two years. KACE subsequently received venture capital funding from Sigma Partners, Norwest Venture Partners, and Focus Ventures. KACE developed appliances designed to help IT personnel more efficiently provision, manage, secure, and service network-connected devices.

In 2007, their competitors included Altiris, Novell ZENworks, BigFix, LANDesk, as well as, products for other larger companies. On February 11, 2010, KACE announced its acquisition by Dell. KACE family appliances were then sold by Dell. In 2012, KACE became a part of the Dell Software group.

On November 1, 2016, Francisco Partners and Elliot Management acquired the Dell Software Group, which was re-launched as Quest Software. KACE products are currently part of the Quest Software portfolio.

== Architecture ==
Since before the company's acquisition by Dell, KACE appliances were sold as physical Dell PowerEdge servers with open-source software technologies. All appliances are available as virtual appliances that can run on VMware ESX, VMware ESXi or Microsoft Hyper-V. Trial versions of the appliances can also run on VMware Player. The appliances are currently not available as physical appliances.

KACE uses FreeBSD, and all collected data is stored in a number of MariaDB databases. Although, all management of the device and the data in the system goes (only) via the web-GUI, users have developed their own interfaces with other management systems by accessing the databases directly. It is also possible to integrate a KACE appliance in third party IT management suites.
