= Sanjiva Weerawarana =

Sri Lankan computer scientist and entrepreneur

- Born: Colombo, Sri Lanka
- Education: Royal College, Colombo; Kent State University; Purdue University (PhD)
- Known for: WSO2; Ballerina (programming language); Apache Software Foundation; WSDL; Lanka Software Foundation
- Awards: Red Hat Summit Award
- Scientific career
- Fields: Computer Scientist
- Workplaces: Purdue University; IBM; WSO2

Sanjiva Weerawarana is a CEO, software developer and open-source software evangelist. He is known for his work on Web Services standards including WSDL, BPEL, and WS-Addressing. He is the founder, chairman and CEO of WSO2, an open-source middleware company, and creator of the Ballerina programming language. His involvement with the Apache Software Foundation includes project work on SOAP, Apache Axis and Apache Axis2.

He has been instrumental in positioning Sri Lanka as a global technology center: In addition to founding WSO2, he started the Lanka Software Foundation to provide a platform for Sri Lankan software engineers to contribute to global open source initiatives. A staunch supporter of education and transparency, he is the founder of the Avinya Foundation, a non-profit dedicated to assisting underprivileged students.

== Early life and education ==
Weerawarana attended Kent State University, majoring in applied mathematics / computer science, before completing a PhD at Purdue University.

== Career ==
After graduation, Weerawarana joined IBM Research working in Hawthorne, New York, until he left to found the startup WSO2.

Weerawarana has been involved with the Apache Software Foundation since 2000 when he worked on the original Apache SOAP project. Weerawarana is an elected Member of the Foundation and is a committer on several projects.

Weerawarana set up the Lanka Software Foundation, and was involved with the Sahana FOSS Disaster Management System.

He is an advisory board member of the company 24/7 Techies. He is a visiting professor and lecturer at the University of Moratuwa and a board alumnus of the Open Source Initiative.

He currently lives in Colombo, Sri Lanka.

=== Publications ===
Notable research publications include:

- Colombo: Lightweight middleware for service-oriented computing
- Enterprise Services

=== Books ===
- Sanjiva Weerawarana, Francisco Curbera, Frank Leymann and Donald F. Ferguson (2005). Web Services Platform Architecture. Prentice Hall. ISBN 0-13-148874-0.
- Maria E. Orlowska, Sanjiva Weerawarana, Michael P. Papazoglou, Jian Yang (2003). Service-Oriented Computing -- ICSOC 2003 : First International Conference, Trento, Italy, December 15–18, 2003, Proceedings. Springer. ISBN 3-540-20681-7.

== See also ==
- Apache Software Foundation
- Open Source Initiative
- WSO2
