= Acoustocerebrography =

Medical test used to diagnose problems in the central nervous system

Acoustocerebrography (ACG) is a medical test used to diagnose changes and problems in the brain and the central nervous system. It allows for the noninvasive examination of the brain's cellular and molecular structure. It can also be applied as a means to diagnose and monitor intracranial pressure, for example as incorporated into continuous brain monitoring devices. ACG uses molecular acoustics, in audible and ultrasound frequency ranges, to monitor changes. It may use microphones, accelerometers, and multifrequency ultrasonic transducers. It does not use any radiation and is completely free of any side effects. ACG also facilitates blood flow analysis as well as the detection of obstructions in cerebral blood flow (from cerebral embolism) or bleeding (from cerebral hemorrhage).

== Passive and active acoustocerebrography ==
=== Passive acoustocerebrography ===
All brain tissue is influenced by blood circulating in the brain's vascular system. With each heartbeat, blood circulates in the skull, following a recurring pattern according to the oscillation produced. This oscillation's effect, in turn, depends on the brain's size, form, structure and its vascular system. Thus, every heartbeat stimulates minuscule motion in the brain tissue as well as cerebrospinal fluid and therefore produces minimal changes in intracranial pressure. These changes can be monitored and measured in the skull. Today, mostly passive sensors like accelerometers are used to identify these signals correctly. Sometimes highly sensitive microphones are utilized.

With a digital signal, it becomes possible to study the patterns of the blood flow moving inside the skull. These patterns form unique signatures that can be analyzed with specially designed algorithms, identifying them either as an inconspicuous, "normal" pattern or as a pattern showing an "abnormal" behavior.

=== Active acoustocerebrography ===
In active ACG applications, a multi-frequency ultrasonic signal is used to detect and classify adverse changes at the cellular or molecular level. In addition to all of the advantages that passive ACG provides, with active ACG it is possible to conduct a spectral analysis of the acoustic signals received. These spectrum analyses not only display changes in the brain's vascular system, but also those in its cellular and molecular structures. One common application of active ACG is the Transcranial Doppler test. More recently, its color version (TCCD) has been deployed. These ultrasonic procedures measure blood flow velocity within the brain's blood vessels. They are used to diagnose embolisms, stenoses and vascular constrictions, for example, in the aftermath of a subarachnoid hemorrhage.

== Fields of application ==
In contrast with applications that provide only momentary images, such as MRI and CT, the results of ACG procedures can be obtained continuously, thus facilitating effortless and non-invasive real-time monitoring. This can be especially helpful during the acute phase directly after a stroke or a traumatic brain injury. The measured data is mathematically processed continuously and displayed on a monitoring device. The computer-aided analysis of the signals enables the physician/nursing staff to precisely interpret the results immediately after device setup. Furthermore, ACG allows for preventive detection of pathological changes in brain tissue.
