= AppAssure =

American software company

- Type: Private
- Industry: Software
- Founded: 2006
- Founder: Najaf Husain
- Defunct: February 24, 2012
- Fate: Acquired by Dell
- Successor: Dell AppAssure, Quest Rapid Recovery
- Headquarters: Reston, Virginia, United States
- Key people: Najaf Husain (Executive Vice President)
- Products: Software
- Owner: Quest Software
- Website: appassure.com at the Wayback Machine (archived 2011-09-04)

AppAssure was a backup and recovery software company founded in 2006 and based in Reston, Virginia.

It was purchased by Dell in 2012. It has since been subsumed by Quest Rapid Recovery.

== Company history ==
AppAssure was founded by Najaf Husain in 2006. In 2008, AppAssure Software received a "Series A" investment by Bain Capital Ventures.

On Friday, Feb. 24, 2012, Dell announced the acquisition of AppAssure, renaming it to Dell AppAssure, which became a part of the Dell Software Group portfolio. Later, upon a new major version release, the company renamed the AppAssure product to Rapid Recovery.

On November 1, 2016, Francisco Partners and Elliot Management acquired Dell Software Group, which was re-launched as Quest Software. Rapid Recovery is currently part of the Quest Software portfolio.
