= Statistica =

Type of analytics software

- Original author: StatSoft
- Developer: TIBCO Software
- Stable release: 14.4.0 (64-bit) / April 2026
- Operating system: Windows
- Type: Numerical analysis
- License: Proprietary software
- Website: www.tibco.com/data-science-and-streaming

Statistica is an advanced analytics software package originally developed by StatSoft and currently maintained by TIBCO Software Inc. Statistica provides data analysis, data management, statistics, data mining, machine learning, text analytics and data visualization procedures.

== Overview ==
Statistica is a suite of analytics software originally developed by StatSoft and acquired by Dell in March 2014. The software includes an array of data analysis, data management, data visualization, and data mining procedures; as well as a variety of predictive modeling, clustering, classification, and exploratory techniques. Additional techniques are available through integration with the free, open source R programming environment. Different packages of analytical techniques are available in six product lines.

== History ==
Statistica originally derived from a set of software packages and add-ons that were initially developed during the mid-1980s by StatSoft. Following the 1986 release of Complete Statistical System (CSS) and the 1988 release of Macintosh Statistical System (MacSS), the first DOS version (trademarked in capitals as STATISTICA) was released in 1991. In 1992, the Macintosh version of Statistica was released.

Statistica 5.0 was released in 1995. It ran on both the new 32-bit Windows 95/NT and the previous 16-bit version, Windows 3.1. It featured many new statistics and graphics procedures, a word-processor-style output editor (combining tables and graphs), and a built-in development environment that enabled the user to easily design new procedures (e.g., via the included Statistica Basic language) and integrate them with the Statistica system.

Statistica 5.1 was released in 1996 followed by Statistica CA '97 and Statistica '98 editions.

In 2001, Statistica 6 was based on the COM architecture and it included multithreading and support for distributed computing.

Statistica 9 was released in 2009, supporting 32-bit and 64-bit computing.

Statistica 10 was released in November 2010. This release featured further performance optimizations for the 64-bit CPU architecture, as well as multithreading technologies, integration with Microsoft SharePoint, Microsoft Office 2010 and other applications, the ability to generate Java and C# code, and other GUI and kernel improvements.

Statistica 12 was released in April 2013 and features a new GUI, performance improvements when handling large amounts of data, a new visual analytic workspace, a new database query tool as well as several analytics enhancements.

Localized versions of Statistica (including the entire family of products) are available in Chinese (both Traditional and Simplified), Czech, English, French, German, Italian, Japanese, Polish, Russian, and Spanish. Documentation is available in Arabic, Chinese, Czech, English, French, German, Hungarian, Italian, Japanese, Korean, Polish, Portuguese, Russian, Spanish, and other languages.

=== Acquisition history ===
Statistica was acquired by Dell in March 2014. In November 2016, Dell sold off several pieces of its software group, and Francisco Partners and Elliott Management Corporation acquired Statistica as part of its purchase of Quest Software from Dell. On May 15, 2017, TIBCO Software Inc. announced it entered into an agreement to acquire Statistica.

=== Release history ===
List of releases:

- PsychoStat - 1984
- Statistical Supplement for Lotus 1-2-3 - 1985
- StatFast/Mac - 1985
- CSS 1 - 1987
- CSS 2 - 1988
- MacSS - 1988
- STATISTICA/DOS - 1991
- STATISTICA/Mac - 1992
- STATISTICA 4.0 - 1993
- STATISTICA 4.5 - 1994
- STATISTICA 5.0 - 1995
- STATISTICA 5.1 - 1996
- STATISTICA 5.5 - 1999
- STATISTICA 6.0 - 2001
- STATISTICA 7.0 - 2004
- STATISTICA 7.1 - 2005
- STATISTICA 8.0 - 2007
- STATISTICA 9.0 - 2009
- STATISTICA 9.1 - 2009
- STATISTICA 10.0 - 2010
- STATISTICA 11.0 - 2012
- STATISTICA 12.0 - 2013
- Statistica 12.5 - April 2014
- Statistica 12.6 - December 2014
- Statistica 12.7 - May 2015
- Statistica 13.0 - Sept 2015
- Statistica 13.1 - June 2016
- Statistica 13.2 - Sep 30, 2016
- Statistica 13.3 - June, 2017
- Statistica 13.3.1 - November 2017
- Statistica 13.4 - May 2018
- Statistica 13.5 - November 2018
- Statistica 13.6 - November 2019
- Statistica 14.0 - December 2020
- Statistica 14.0.1 - July 2022
- Statistica 14.1.0 - June 2023
- Statistica 14.2.0 - April 2024
- Statistica 14.3.0 - February 2025
- Statistica 14.4.0 - April 2026

== Graphics ==
Statistica includes analytic and exploratory graphs in addition to standard 2- and 3-dimensional graphs. Brushing actions (interactive labeling, marking, and data exclusion) allow for investigation of outliers and exploratory data analysis.

== User interface ==
Operation of the software typically involves loading a table of data and applying statistical functions from pull-down menus or (in versions starting from 9.0) from the ribbon bar. The menus then prompt for the variables to be included and the type of analysis required. It is not necessary to type command prompts. Each analysis may include graphical or tabular output and is stored in a separate workbook.

== See also ==
- Comparison of statistical packages
- StatSoft
