= Vinny Smith =

American businessman (born 1964)

- Born: Vincent Coburn Smith Jr; 1964 (age 61–62); Baltimore, Maryland, US
- Occupation: Businessman
- Known for: Former CEO of Quest Software, founder of Toba Capital
- Spouse: Tori Smith
- Children: 5

Vincent Coburn Smith Jr (born 1964) is an American businessman, billionaire, former CEO of Quest Software, and founder of Toba Capital.

== Education ==
Smith was born in 1964 in Baltimore, Maryland. After graduating from Mount Saint Joseph High School, he received a bachelor's degree in computer science from the University of Delaware.

== Career ==
After graduation in 1986, he worked as a software developer and in sales leadership for Oracle Corp. In 1992, Smith and an associate from Oracle co-founded Patrol software, which was acquired two years later by BMC Software, Inc. for $34 million.

Smith helped Jeff Horing and Jerry Murdock launch Insight Partners in 1995, and led the firm's investment into Quest Software. He joined Quest as its CEO in 1998 and took the company public the following year. Quest was acquired by Dell in 2012. At the time, Quest had over 4,000 global employees and approximately $1 billion in annual revenue.

Smith founded Toba Capital in 2013. Toba Capital is an investment firm with over $3.5 billion in assets under management, principally funded by Smith's family office. The firm is thematically focused on technology and sustainability, and is active in venture, growth equity, public equities, and real estate. Toba has made over 200 investments, and has staked over 50 external funds.

In 2021 Smith created a company to expand the inland surf market. Its first project, the Palm Springs Surf Club, opened in El Segundo in 2024.

== Philanthropy ==
Smith has pledged 50% of Toba Capital’s returns to foundations that make sustainability-related investments and charitable donations. The balance of returns will be reinvested into companies with the potential to produce meaningful quantities of high-quality jobs and shift markets for the common good.

Smith’s primary charitable foundations are Teach a Man to Fish and Walking Softer. Walking Softer was founded to promote, celebrate and in a small way resource the invention of a new economy built on circularity, conservation, and renewal, where the long-term health of the Earth and its inhabitants is considered as deeply and thoughtfully as profit.

== Personal life ==
Smith is married to Tori Smith. They reside in Austin, Texas, and Jackson, Wyoming. Smith has five children.

Smith is an avid sportsman enjoying skiing, snowboarding, hiking, biking, surfing and golf.

== Recognition ==
- In 1999 Smith was ranked number 9 on Fortune's 40 under 40
- In January 2000 Smith was listed on Forbes 400 Wealthiest Americans (129th)
- In January 2001 Smith was ranked no. 320 in Forbes 400 Wealthiest Americans list
