= StatSoft =

Original developer of Statistica

- Industry: Software
- Founded: 1984
- Area served: Australia; Brazil; Bulgaria; China; Czech Republic; France; Germany; Hungary; India; Israel; Italy; Japan; Korea; Netherlands; Norway; Poland; Portugal; Russia; Spain; South Africa; Sweden; Switzerland; Taiwan; United Kingdom
- Parent: Dell, Inc.

StatSoft is the original developer of Statistica. Dell acquired it in March 2014. Statistica is an analytics software portfolio that provides enterprise and desktop software for statistics, data analysis, data management, data visualization, data mining, which is also called predictive analytics and quality control.

== History ==
StatSoft was established in 1984 as a partnership of a group of university professors and scientists. Its first products had menu-driven libraries of flexible statistical procedures and ran on microcomputer platforms such as Apple II, CP/M, Commodore and MS-DOS.

With the release of Statistica 9 in May 2009, both 32-bit and 64-bit native versions became available. Its current product suite, Statistica 12, was released in May 2013. Statistica is used worldwide at major corporations, government agencies and universities.

On March 24, 2014, StatSoft was acquired by Dell in an effort to bolster Dell's ‘big data’ offering. StatSoft's CEO at the time of the Dell acquisition was Paul Lewicki.

On June 20, 2016, Dell sold Dell Software Group (which included StatSoft) to private equity firm Francisco Partners and Elliott Management.

On May 15, 2017, Quest Software sold Statistica to TIBCO Software.

== Product lines ==
Statistica Enterprise
allows connections to data repositories and interactive filtering of data, contains analysis and report templates, and allows for management of security and permissions.
Web-based Applications
this system makes the functionality of any of the Statistica products available via a Web browser.
Data Mining
a collection of data mining and machine learning algorithms that include: support vector machines, EM and k-means clustering, classification & regression trees, generalized additive models, independent component analysis, stochastic gradient boosted trees, ensembles of neural networks, automatic feature selection, MARSplines, CHAID trees, nearest neighbor methods, association rules, and random forests.
Statistica Desktop
designed for deployment on a single workstation. Spreadsheets, configurations and macros are all stored on the User's local workstation as a stand-alone application. Includes general purpose statistical, graphical, and analytic data management procedures.

== Services ==
StatSoft's professional services groups provided a range of services to complement the Statistica software: software integration and customization services, the development of custom Web applications based on Statistica Enterprise Server technology, and the installation of a general-purpose Web Server system. StatSoft also offered deployment of data mining software designed to work with specific data warehouses and solve particular ranges of problems. Additionally, statistical consulting services were available. StatSoft offered both introductory and advanced training courses in major cities in the United States and overseas. Technical Services provided software validation services as part of the deployment of Statistica applications. These services include requirement gathering and documentation, validation planning, installation qualification, operational qualification, and performance qualification.

TIBCO still freely provides the StatSoft Electronic Statistics Textbook, now renamed to "Data Science Textbook".

== Support for European countries in crisis ==
In October 2012 StatSoft announced that it would make its Statistica Enterprise Software available for free to companies in Greece, Portugal and Spain. This included StatSoft's Big Data Analytics Platform. StatSoft's stated aim was to help boost these country's productivity and competitiveness, and to facilitate their recovery. StatSoft CEO, Paul Lewicki, has written an open letter to the CEOs of US software companies urging them to join this “Free Enterprise Software for Struggling European Economies” initiative.
