= Guy Wallace =

American radio personality

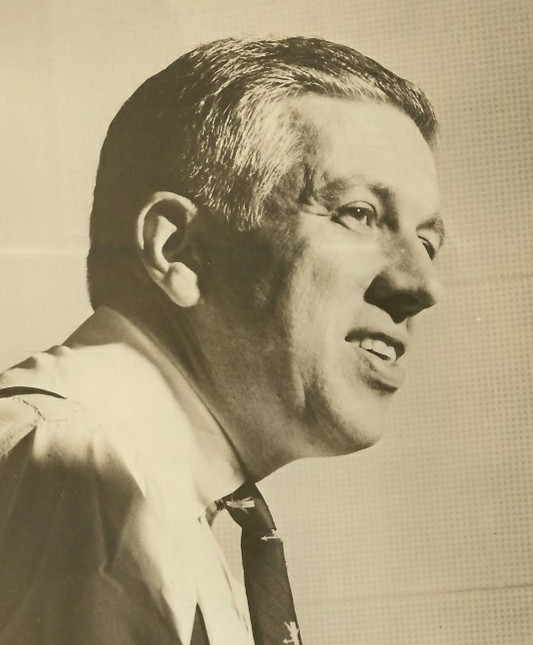
Guy Wallace around 1950

Guy Wallace (born Guy Charles Francis Faulds; 1913 – August 29, 1967) was a Chicago and New York radio personality.

Faulds graduated in 1935 from Mount St. Joseph College in Baltimore. From 1940 to 1943 he and his first wife Bernadette Isaak (1916-2000) lived in Bloomington and Chicago, Illinois. He began using the professional alias Guy Wallace by 1942.

He was employed by WNEW, WMGM, WCBS, WNBC and WOR between 1947 and 1957, and by that year was a freelance announcer in New York City. In 1951 he resigned as program director at WFDR and became an Executive Producer and head of American Production for Radio Free Europe. From 1957 until his death he was employed by The World this Morning and Bandstand USA for the Mutual Broadcasting System.

Wallace was married secondly to fashion model Margaret Mohlin (1926-1965), who was Miss Photoflash U.S.A. of 1947 and as his wife was known as Margaret (Mrs. Charles) Wallace-Faulds. He was eventually known as Guy Charles Francis Faulds Sr., and died in Freeport, New York.
