= Quest Software =

Privately held software company based in California

Quest Software, Inc.
- Type: Private
- Industry: Software
- Founded: 1987; 39 years ago, in Newport Beach, California, United States
- Founders: David M. Doyle; Doran G. Machin
- Fate: Acquired by Clearlake Capital
- Headquarters: Austin, Texas, United States
- Area served: Worldwide
- Key people: Tim Page(CEO)
- Products: Data management; Identity security; Platform modernization
- Website: www.quest.com

Quest Software, Inc., doing business as Quest, is a privately held software company headquartered in Austin, Texas, United States. The company develops software tools and platforms that support data management, cybersecurity, identity and access management, and platform modernization for enterprise IT environments. The company was founded in 1987 in Newport Beach, California, and currently has 53 offices in 24 countries as of 2026.

== History ==
Quest Software was founded in 1987 in Newport Beach, California, with a line of products for HP Multi-Programming Executive (MPE). In 1995, Vinny Smith joined the company. The following year, Quest entered the database management market with an Oracle SQL database tuning product. In 1997, Quest opened an office in the United Kingdom.

Doug Garn joined Quest as the vice president of sales in 1998. That same year, Quest added offices in Germany and Australia, and Smith became CEO.

In October, Quest acquired TOAD.

On August 13, 1999, Quest Software went public.

In 2007, Quest Software acquired ScriptLogic, and Charonware s.r.o from the Czech Republic. Charonware made CASE Studio2, and after being acquired, Quest folded it into the TOAD Data Modeler product.

Garn became CEO and president, and Smith became executive chairman of Quest in 2008. In 2009, Alan Fudge became vice president of sales. In 2011, Smith became CEO and chairman, and Garn became vice chairman.

On September 28, 2012, Dell announced it had completed the acquisition of Quest Software.

On November 1, 2016, Francisco Partners and Elliott Management completed the purchase of Dell Software, and the company re-launched itself as Quest Software.

On June 1, 2017, One Identity was announced as an independent brand, but remained part of the Quest family of businesses.

On September 2, 2020, Quest acquired Binary Tree. On January 5, 2021, Quest acquired erwin, Inc., including erwin Data Modeler.

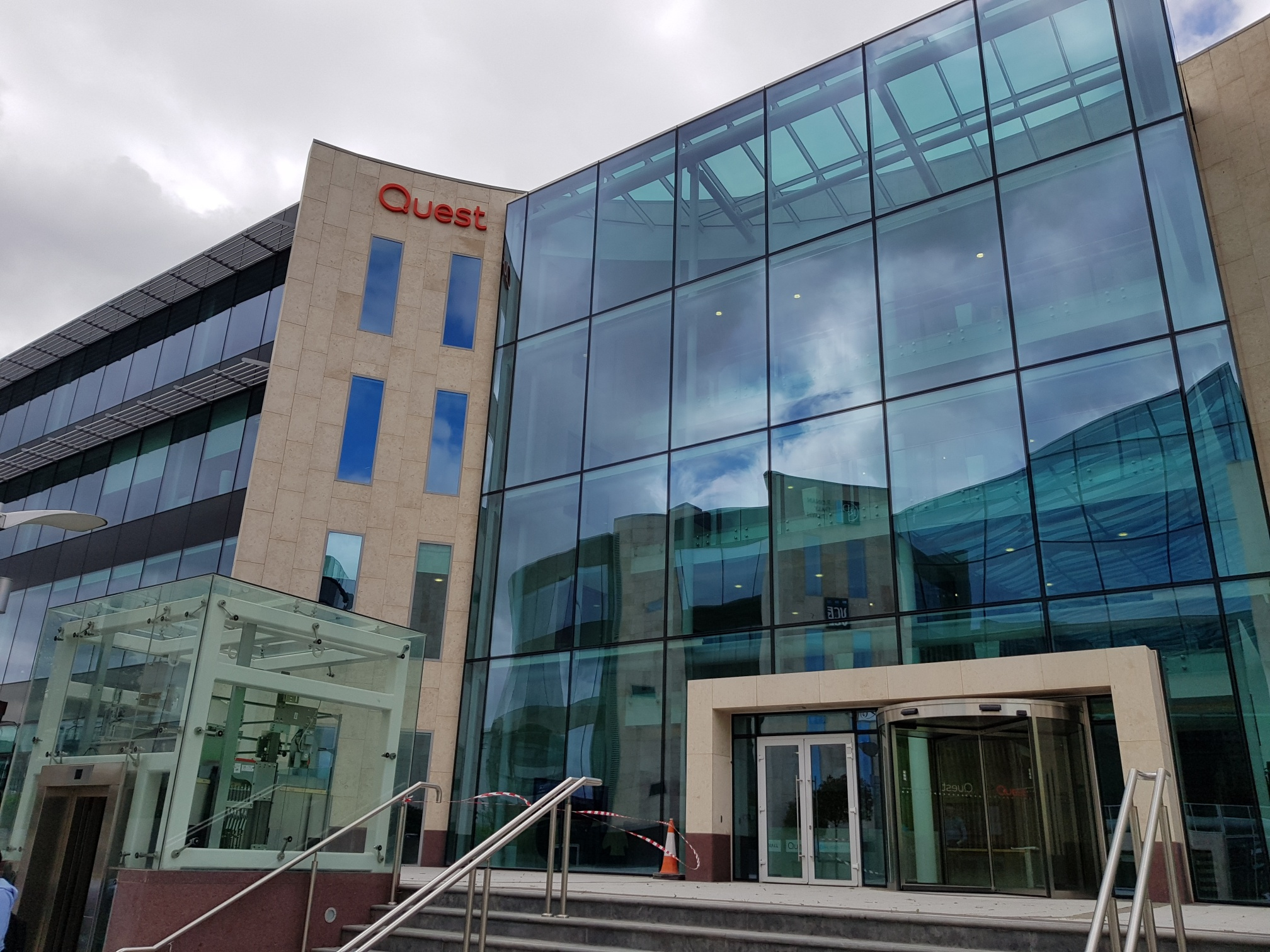
Quest Software EMEA headquarters in Cork, Ireland

On November 29, 2021, Clearlake Capital bought Quest from Francisco Partners for $5.4 billion, including debt.

On January 27, 2025, Quest named Tim Page CEO.

In June 2026, Quest acquired cybersecurity firm, Anetac.
