= Onie =

Onie may refer to:

- Onie, West Virginia, an unincorporated community in Wetzel County
- Open Network Install Environment, an open source software project for computer network switches

== People ==
- Rebecca Onie
- Onie Wheeler
