= Open Network Install Environment =

Open source boot loader

The Open Network Install Environment (ONIE) is an open-source "install environment", that acts as an enhanced boot loader utilizing facilities in a Linux/BusyBox environment.

== Environment ==
This small Linux operating system allows end-users and channel partners to install a network operating system as part of data center provisioning, similar to the way servers are provisioned with an operating system of choice.

ONIE enables network switch hardware suppliers, distributors and resellers to manage their operations based on a small number of hardware stock keeping unit (SKUs). This in turn creates economies of scale in manufacturing, distribution, stocking, and return merchandise authorization (RMA) enabling an ecosystem of both network hardware and operating system alternatives.

ONIE was created by Cumulus Networks (now a part of NVIDIA) in 2012 before it was adopted by the Open Compute Project in 2013.

== See also ==
- Open-source computing hardware
- Pica8
- Preboot Execution Environment (PXE)
- Software-defined networking
