= Pica8 =

- Type: Private
- Industry: Cloud Networking
- Founded: 2009
- Headquarters: Palo Alto, California, USA
- Key people: Brad Bullington (CEO); James Liao (CTO & co-founder); Lin Du (VP of Engineering & co-founder); Niraj Jain (Head of International Business Operations)
- Products: Software -- Linux-based NOS, automated switch configuration
- Website: pica8.com

Pica8 is a computer networking company headquartered in Palo Alto, California, United States. Pica8 is a provider of SDN software solutions, delivering advanced software-defined networking (SDN) solutions for datacenter, cloud computing environments and large enterprise customers. The company's products include a Linux-based L2/L3 and OpenFlow-supporting network operating system, PicOS, which is shipped as standalone software that can be loaded onto a range of 1/10/40/100 Gigabit Ethernet switches based on commoditized switches purchased from original design manufacturers (ODMs).

The company's approach is to combine commodity network hardware (from manufacturers like Accton, Foxconn, Quanta) with Debian Linux, L2/L3 protocol stacks, a full enterprise feature set, OpenFlow controller and Open vSwitch (OVS) to create both a more "democratic" SDN solutions with competitive price compared to conventional embedded switches as well as more flexible and scalable disaggregated enterprise networking solutions.

== History ==
The company was founded in 2009. It launched a family of OpenFlow-enabled Ethernet switches in August 2009 and has been selling products ever since.

In October 2012 Pica8 raised $6.6m in Series A funding from VantagePoint Capital Partners to support its sales and product development. On 10 December 2012 the company exited stealth mode with the introduction of SDN reference architecture aimed at cloud providers.

By 2013, among about 100 Pica8's customers, including large service providers and hosting companies, were such companies as Baidu, Yahoo! Japan and NTT Communications.

In December 2013, the company launched the Pica8 SDN Starter Kit, an "out-of-the-box" kit that includes an open-source network controller, a programmable network tap, an open-source network intrusion detection system, and other components meant to give customers a complete SDN solution, which would be quick to implement.

In April 2014 Pica8 claimed to be the first vendor to support the latest version 1.4 of OpenFlow and to have over 300 customers globally.

== Products ==
=== PicOS ===
PicOS (formerly known as XorPlus) is a network operating system (NOS) that Pica8 has developed based on XORP, an eXtensible Open Router Platform. The operating system works on an unmodified Linux kernel and is extended with a range of network and switching services.

PicOS includes a traditional Layer-2 / Layer-3 switching mode (L2/L3 Mode) and has support for OpenFlow protocol, standardized by the Open Networking Foundation (ONF), through Open vSwitch (OVS). OVS runs as a process on the Debian Linux distribution.

=== PicaPilot ===
In addition to PicOS, Pica8 offers a second core technology solution called PicaPilot, which was announced in May 2018. PicaPilot is an automated switch configuration and management application that runs on Pica8-enabled switches alongside PicOS. Designed as a replacement for legacy Ethernet switch stacks and chassis switches, PicaPilot compresses dozens of access- and aggregation-layer leaf-spine topology switches into a single layer and allows them to be managed as a single logical switch with a single consolidated IP address.

=== CrossFlow ===
On 10 November 2014 Pica8 announced CrossFlow, a new feature in the PicOS NOS that enables network managers to integrate OpenFlow applications and business policies with existing layer 2/layer 3 networks. Users can run layer 2/layer 3 protocols and OpenFlow protocols on all the switch ports in a network at the same time. OpenFlow can be used for policy-driven applications to bring business logic to the network. The traditional network can optimize packet transport and performance with protocols, such as OSPF, Spanning Tree, and BGP.

== Awards and recognitions ==
- The 10 Coolest Networking Startups Of 2013 according to CRN (2013).
- AlwaysOn OnDemand Companies to Watch (2013).
- AlwaysOn OnDemand 100 Top Private Companies (2014).
- AlwaysOn Global 250 Top Private Companies (2014, along with companies like Acquia, Couchbase, Dropbox, MongoDB).

== See also ==
- Linux
- Network switch
- Router
- Packet switching
- Circuit switching
- Fully switched network
- Cumulus Networks
- Software-defined networking
- Open Compute Project
- Open-source computing hardware
