= Open Compute Project =

Organization that shares designs of data center products

- Abbreviation: OCP
- Formation: 2011; 15 years ago
- Type: organisation
- Purpose: Sharing designs of data center products
- Region served: Worldwide
- Members: 50+ corporations
- Website: opencompute.org

The Open Compute Project (OCP) is an organization that facilitates the sharing of data center product designs and industry best practices among companies. Founded in 2011, OCP has significantly influenced the design and operation of large-scale computing facilities worldwide.

As of February 2025, over 400 companies across the world are members of OCP, including Arm, Meta, IBM, Wiwynn, Intel, Nokia, Google, Microsoft, Seagate Technology, Dell, Rackspace, Hewlett Packard Enterprise, NVIDIA, Cisco, Goldman Sachs, Fidelity, Lenovo, SAP, Accton Technology Corporation and Alibaba Group.

== Structure ==
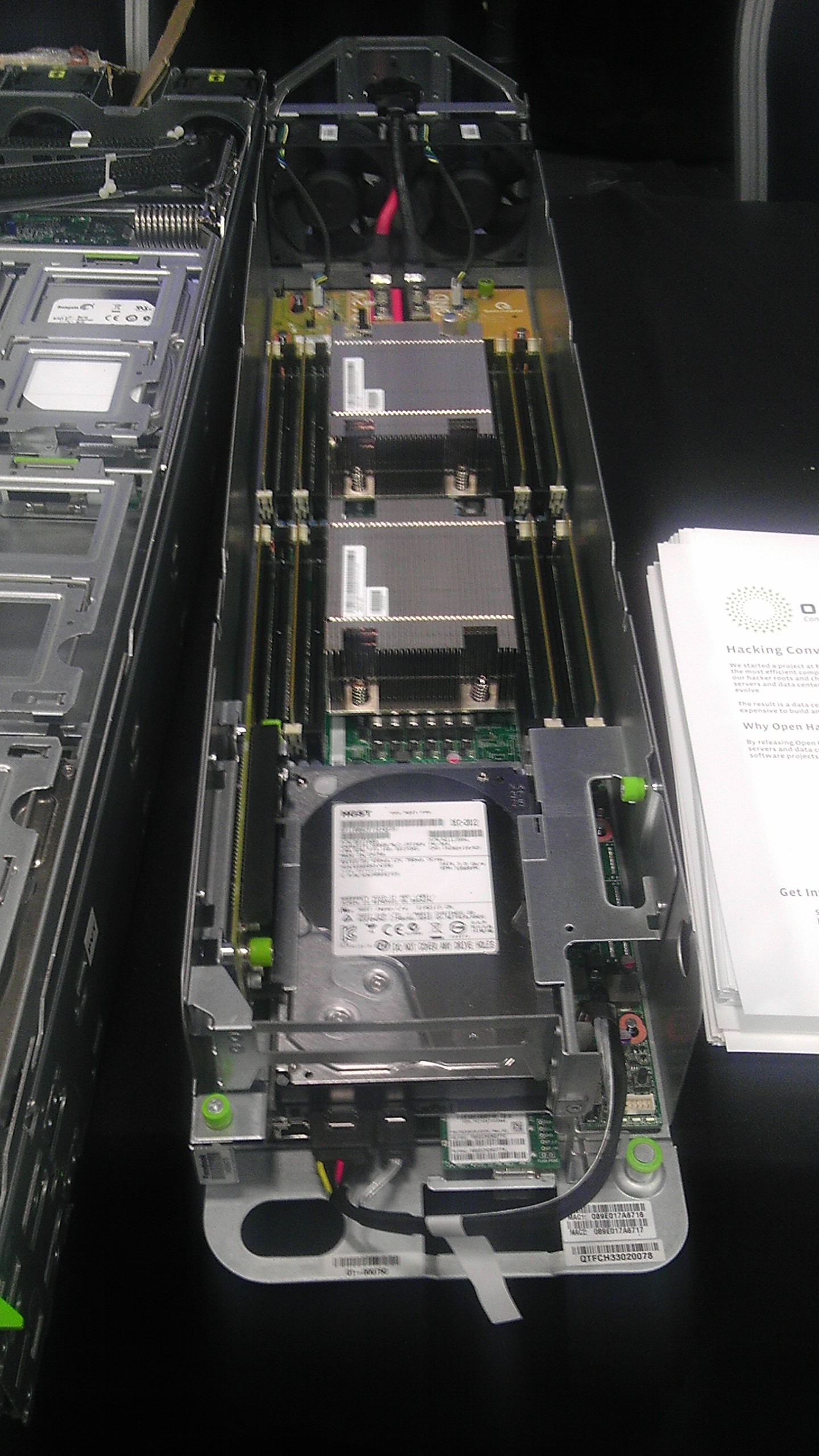
Open Compute V2 Server

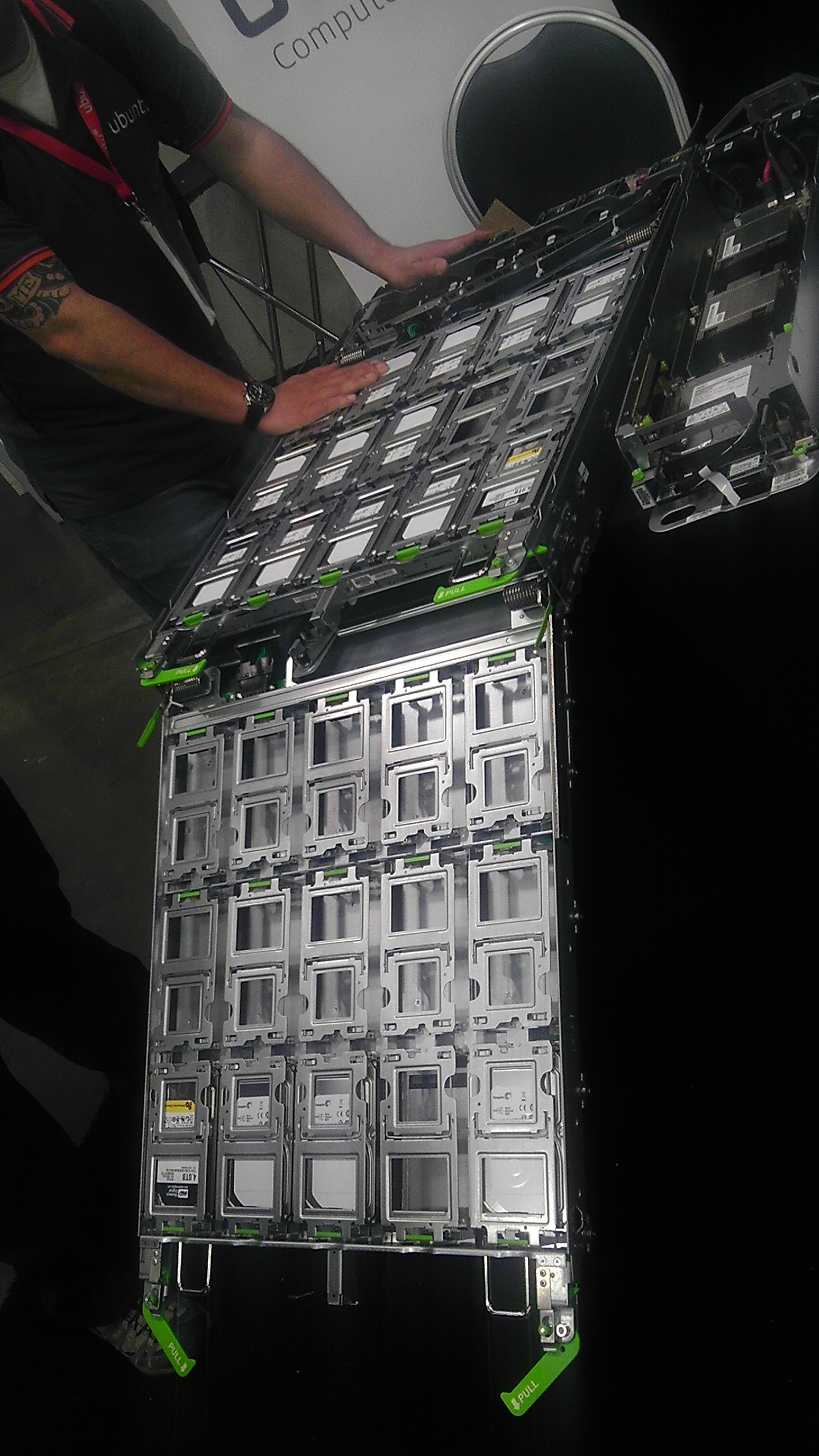
Open Compute V2 Drive Tray, 2nd lower tray extended

The Open Compute Project Foundation is a 501(c)(6) non-profit incorporated in the state of Delaware, United States. OCP has multiple committees, including the board of directors, advisory board and steering committee to govern its operations.

As of July 2026, there are eight members who serve on the board of directors which is made up of one individual member and seven organizational members. Andy Bechtolsheim is the individual member. In addition to David Ramku who chairs the board and represents Meta, other organizations on the Open Compute board of directors are Arm (Mohamed Awad), Microsoft (Saurabh Dighe), AMD (Robert Hormuth), Google (Amber Huffman), Intel (Jeff McVeigh), NVIDIA (Rob Ober), as well as OCP CEO George Tchaparian. A list of members can be found on the OCP website.

== History ==
The Open Compute Project began at Facebook (now Meta) in 2009 as an internal project called "Project Freedom". The hardware designs and engineering teams were led by Amir Michael (Manager, Hardware Design) and sponsored by Jonathan Heiliger (VP, Technical Operations) and Frank Frankovsky (Director, Hardware Design and Infrastructure). The three would later open source the designs of Project Freedom and co-found the Open Compute Project. The project was announced at a press event at Facebook's headquarters in Palo Alto on April 7, 2011.

== OCP projects ==
The Open Compute Project Foundation maintains a number of OCP projects, such as:

=== Server designs ===
In 2013, two years after the Open Compute Project had started, it was noted that the goal of a more modular server design was "still a long way from live data centers". However, by then some aspects published had been used in Facebook's Prineville data center to improve energy efficiency, as measured by the power usage effectiveness index defined by The Green Grid.

Efforts to advance server compute node designs included one for Intel processors and one for AMD processors. Also in 2013, Calxeda contributed a design with ARM architecture processors. Since then, several generations of OCP server designs have been deployed: Wildcat (Intel), Spitfire (AMD), Windmill (Intel E5-2600), Watermark (AMD), Winterfell (Intel E5-2600 v2) and Leopard (Intel E5-2600 v3).

=== OCP Accelerator Module ===
OCP Accelerator Module (OAM) is a design specification for hardware architectures that implement artificial intelligence systems that require high module-to-module bandwidth.

OAM is used in some of AMD's Instinct accelerator modules.

=== Rack and power designs ===
Designs for a mechanical mounting system to replace standard 19-inch racks have been published, with a cabinet the same outside width (600 mm) and depth as existing racks, but with an interior space allowing for wider equipment chassis with a 537 mm width (21 inches). This allows more equipment to fit in the same volume and improves air flow. Compute chassis sizes are defined in multiples of an OpenU or OU, which is 48 mm, slightly taller than the 44 mm rack unit defined for 19-inch racks. As of March 2026, the most current base mechanical definition is the Open Rack V3.1 Specification.

At the time the base specification was released, Meta also defined in greater depth the specifications for the rectifiers and power shelf. Specifications for the power monitoring interface (PMI), a communications interface enabling upstream communications between the rectifiers and battery backup unit(BBU) were published by Meta that same year, with Delta Electronics as the main technical contributor to the BBU spec.

However, since 2022 the AI boom in the data center has created higher power requirements in order to satisfy the demands of AI accelerators that have been released. As of September 2024, Meta is in the process of updating its Open Rack v3 rectifier, power shelf, battery backup and power management interface specifications to accommodate this increased energy demand.

In May 2024, at an Open Compute regional summit, Meta and Rittal outlined their plans for development of their High Power Rack (HPR) ecosystem in conjunction with rack, power and cable partners, increasing power capacity in the rack to 92 kilowatts or more. At the same meeting, Delta Electronics and Advanced Energy reported on their progress in developing new Open Compute standard specifications for power shelf and rectifier designs for HPR applications. Rittal also outlined their collaboration with Meta in designing airflow containment, busbar designs and grounding schemes for the new HPR requirements.

=== Data storage ===
Open Vault storage building blocks (also called "Knox") offer high disk densities, with 30 drives in a 2 OU Open Rack chassis designed for easy disk drive replacement. The 3.5 inch disks are stored in two drawers, five across and three deep in each drawer, with connections via serial attached SCSI. There is a "cold storage" variant where idle disks power down to reduce energy consumption. Another design concept was contributed by Hyve Solutions, a division of Synnex, in 2012. At the OCP Summit 2016 Facebook, together with Taiwanese ODM Wistron's spin-off Wiwynn, introduced "Lightning", a flexible NVMe JBOF (just a bunch of flash), based on the existing Open Vault (Knox) design.

=== Energy efficient data centers ===
The OCP has published data center designs for energy efficiency. These include power distribution at three-phase 277/480 VAC, which eliminates one transformer stage in typical North American data centers, a single voltage (12.5 VDC) power supply designed to work with 277/480 VAC input, and 48 VDC battery backup. For European (and other 230V countries) datacenters, there is a specification for 230/400 VAC power distribution and its conversion to 12.5 VDC.

=== Open networking switches ===
On May 8, 2013, an effort to define an open network switch was announced. The plan was to allow Facebook to load its own operating system software onto its top-of-rack switches. Press reports predicted that more expensive and higher-performance switches would continue to be popular, while less expensive products treated more like a commodity.

The first attempt at an open networking switch by Facebook was designed together with Taiwanese ODM Accton using Broadcom Trident II chip and is called "Wedge"; the Linux OS that it runs is called "FBOSS". Later switch contributions include "6-pack" and Wedge-100, based on Broadcom Tomahawk chips. Similar switch hardware designs have been contributed by: Accton Technology Corporation (and its Edgecore Networks subsidiary), Mellanox Technologies, Interface Masters Technologies, Agema Systems. Capable of running Open Network Install Environment (ONIE)-compatible network operating systems such as Cumulus Linux, Switch Light OS by Big Switch Networks, or PICOS by Pica8. A similar project for a custom switch for the Google platform had been rumored, and evolved to use the OpenFlow protocol.

=== Servers ===
A sub-project for Mezzanine (NIC) OCP NIC 3.0 specification 1v00 was released in late 2019 establishing three form factors: SFF, TSFF, and LFF.

== Litigation ==
In March, 2015, BladeRoom Group Limited and Bripco (UK) Limited sued Facebook, Emerson Electric Co. and others alleging that Facebook has disclosed BladeRoom and Bripco's trade secrets for prefabricated data centers in the Open Compute Project. Facebook petitioned for the lawsuit to be dismissed, but this was rejected in 2017. A confidential mid-trial settlement was agreed in April 2018.

== See also ==
- List of open-source hardware projects
- Telecom Infra Project – Organization that shares telecom technologies and best practices
- OpenBMC – Open source implementation of the Baseboard Management Controllers (BMC) Firmware Stack
- OpenPOWER Foundation – Industry organization that manages Power ISA
- Novena (computing platform) – Open-source computing hardware project
