= ORW =

ORW may refer to:

- Ohio Reformatory for Women
- Operation Red Wings, a 2005 military operation
- Ormara Airport, Pakistan
- Endoglin, a protein
- Open Rack Wide, a data center gear rack specification
