= Accton =

Taiwanese electronics company

Accton Technology Corporation
- Native name: 智邦科技
- Type: Public
- Traded as: TWSE: 2345
- Industry: Electronics
- Founded: February 1988; 38 years ago
- Headquarters: Zhubei, Hsinchu, Taiwan
- Area served: Worldwide
- Key people: Kuo-Hsiu Huang (Chair); Jakal Lee (CEO); Fanny Chen (CFO)
- Products: Network Switches; Edge Computing; Network Access; Wireless Networking; Broadband Networking; SmartNICs
- Production output: ▲8.82 million units (2022)
- Services: Design and Development; Supply Chain; Manufacturing
- Revenue: ▲US$2.58 billion (2022)
- Net income: ▲US$273 million (2022)
- Number of employees: 3,242
- Subsidiaries: Edgecore Networks; IgniteNet; SMC Networks
- Website: www.accton.com

Accton Technology Corporation (Chinese: 智邦科技; pinyin: Zhìbāng Kējì) is a Taiwanese company in the electronics industry that primarily engages in the development and manufacture of networking and communication solutions, as an original equipment manufacturer (OEM) or original design manufacturer (ODM) partner. Accton has manufacturing plants in Taiwan (Hsinchu), China (Shenzhen), and Vietnam (Phú Thọ province), supported by research and development centers in Taiwan, Shanghai, and California. Its products include 100G, 400G, and 800G switches designed for data center applications, along with wireless devices and artificial intelligence acceleration hardware.

The company partners with Amazon, HPE, and telecommunications operators.

Accton alternative logo

== History ==
Accton was founded on February 9, 1988. Accton filled its IPO in November 1995.

=== Acquisitions ===
1997 – SMC Networks
1999 – Emitcom
2000 – Minority stake in USRobotics modem division from 3Com (with NatSteel from Singapore)
2010 – Mototech
2021 – Stake in Xsight Labs

=== Joint ventures ===
2002 – Accton and SVA Group China – formed SVA Accton
2003 – Accton and Philips – formed Arcadyan Technology
2011 – Accton and Alvarion – formed AWB

=== Exits ===
2004 – ADMTek Inc to Infineon for €80 million
2006 – 69% of Arcadyan Technology to Compal for US$30 million

== Products ==
=== 800G Switches ===
Accton's 51.2 Tbit/s platforms leverage Broadcom's Tomahawk 5 silicon and Intel's Ice Lake-D CPUs, targeting modern data centers and AI/ML workloads.

AS9817-64D (QSFP-DD) and AS9817-64O (OSFP800): Both are 2RU switches featuring 64 x 800 GbE ports, with flexible configurations for super-spine role within spine/leaf network topologies.

DCS8500-128D: A 4RU switch with 128 x 400G QSFP112 ports, this high-density platform is designed to improve bandwidth management and simplify spine/leaf topologies.

AS9936-128D: A 6RU Network Cloud Fabric switch featuring 128 x OSFP800 fabric interfaces. It is a key component for a VoQ-based fabric Distributed Disaggregated Chassis Network Cloud Cluster, designed for AI back-end networking.

The AS9936-128D is specifically designed to support expansive AI/ML clusters, capable of scaling up to 32K-GPU 800G/400G cluster with a two-stage DDC network architecture. This is achieved in combination with the ASA929-18XKE, a 14.4 Tbit/s full-duplex 2RU Network Cloud Packet Forwarder that features 18 x OSFP800 network interfaces and 20 x OSFP800 fabric interfaces.

== Services ==
In 2022, Accton partnered with TSMC, Delta Electronics, Gigabyte Technology, MIRLE, and 3M to develop newer data center immersion cooling offerings that reduce energy consumption. That year Accton began shipping 400G switches at scale. The transition from 100G to 400G switches was driven by the increasing demands of 5G, Wi-Fi 6, IoT, AI, and digital transformations in consumer electronics and enterprise sectors. This escalation in demand is particularly notable among major tech companies like Google, Microsoft, and Facebook. Also in 2022, Accton developed Vodafone's disaggregated cell site gateway (DCSG) routers for their 5G network. These routers are critical to Vodafone's strategy to automate networks and diversify vendors, supporting the company's expansion of its 5G infrastructure as part of its open RAN initiatives.

Since 2021, Accton has been involved in developing and producing multiple generations of Intel's Habana Labs GOYA AI Inference Card, GAUDI AI Training Card, and GAUDI HLS-1 AI Training System. These products are designed to enhance AI computation speeds and efficiency in cloud environments.

Since 2020, Accton (through its Edgecore Networks subsidiary) has been shipping Terragraph-enabled hardware units to service providers and system integrators worldwide. Terragraph is a gigabit wireless technology developed by Meta (formerly Facebook), designed to deliver high-speed internet connectivity over the air, close to fiber-optic speeds, using the 60 GHz spectrum band.

In 2019, Accton designed and manufactured switches for Amazon, AT&T and NTT Com and Annapurna Labs.

In 2016, through the Open Compute Project (OCP), Accton had the opportunity to develop Meta's Wedge 100 that equip their hyperscale 100G data centers. Accton has played a crucial role in designing and manufacturing the Minipack switches that are integral to Meta's F16 data center network topology. These modular switches, tailored for 100G and 400G applications, are deployed in various capacities, including as fabric, spine, and aggregator, to efficiently manage data traffic across Meta's extensive network infrastructure.

Earlier initiatives include Accton's partnership in 2015 with Hewlett Packard Enterprise (HPE) in the OpenSwitch initiative, alongside Broadcom, Intel, and VMware. In 2014, Accton manufactured Linux-based switches for Cumulus and provided hardware solutions for Big Switch Networks. In 2002, the company was chosen as Microsoft's OEM partner to supply their Microsoft Broadband Networking product line. Since 1999, as an EMS provider, Accton has manufactured networking products for major OEMs such as Cisco, Intel, 3Com, Juniper, and Fujitsu.

== Finance ==
During the year 2009, Accton obtained approximately 69% and 14% of its total revenue from switches and WLAN products, respectively.

During the year 2017, Accton obtained approximately 68% and 12% out of its total revenue from network switches and network appliances. Network access came third with 9%, followed by 5% in Wireless networking and 1% of the revenue coming from Broadband networking gear.

Total sales for 2018 increased 18.23 percent annually to NT$43.09 billion (over US$1.3 billion) with Facebook, Amazon (company), and HP Inc weighing in.

Year	Revenue (in million US$)	Net income (in million US$)	Total Assets (in million US$)	Price per Share (in NT$ at close on the last trading day of December)
2008	633	12	368	8.41
2009	564	21	428	15.01
2010	742	31	434	19.70
2011	842	28	458	13.75
2012	868	28	436	16.15
2013	724	18	433	15.75
2014	731	21	453	16.00
2015	792	37	480	31.95
2016	940	60	560	50.90
2017	1166	82	600	106.00
2018	1379	94	716	98.60
2019	1790	159	900	168.00
2020	1847	180	1000	316.00
2021	2128	170	1148	260.00
2022	2603	266	1366	234.50
2023	2736	288	1587	523.00
2024	2940			

== Corporate Affairs ==
=== Management ===
Accton's key management personnel consists of:

- Kuo-Hsiu Huang (Chairperson)
- Jackal Lee (Chief Executive Officer and President)
- Fanny Chen (Chief Financial Officer)
- Paul Kim (CIO & CISO, Information Center)
- Michael K.T. Lee (Senior Vice President of R&D)
- Melody Chiang (Senior Vice President of Business Management)
- Jackal Lee (Senior Vice President of Product Supply & Demand)
- Enco Liew (Vice President of Value Line Business Center)
- Ben Cheng (Vice President of Manufacture Center)
- Joseph Hsieh (Vice President of Compute & Acceleration Business Center)
- Lucas Chain (Vice President)

=== Board of directors ===
Accton's board consists of the following directors:

- Kuo-Hsiu Huang (chairperson at Accton, former Director at Accton)
- Chiu-Hsia Wei (Vice Chairperson at Accton)
- Heng-Yi Du (Director at Accton, chairman at Wan Yuan Textiles, Chung Tai Transportation, and Ting Sing Co, Director of Ve Wong Corporation, SECOM, South China Insurance, and The Ambassador Hotel)
- Ankur Singla (Independent Director at Accton, former CEO of Volterra, SVP at F5 Networks, SVP/GM Juniper Networks, CTO at HPE Aruba)
- Shu-Chieh Huang (Independent Director at Accton, former CEO of Deloitte Taiwan)
- Fa-Yauh Lee (Independent Director at Accton, Independent Director at Aethertek)
- Eizo Kobayashi (Independent Director at Accton, chairman at Itochu, Independent Director at Omron and Japan Airlines and Japan Exchange Group)

=== Recognition ===
2018 – Outstanding Work Environment in Gender Equality from the Hsinchu Science Park Bureau
2018 – National Quality Award from the Ministry of Economic Affairs (Presented by President Tsai Ing-Wen)

The New York Times follows some stories about this company.

== CSIRO patent issues ==
The Australian Commonwealth Scientific and Industrial Research Organisation (CSIRO) holds the patent to a component of the IEEE 802.11n standard. This component is also part of other protocols marketed under the Wi-Fi trademark. The IEEE requested from the CSIRO a Letter of Assurance that no lawsuits would be filed for anyone implementing the standard. In September 2007, CSIRO responded that they would not be able to comply with this request since litigation was involved.

In April 2009, it was revealed that CSIRO reached a settlement with 14 companies including Accton plus other major technology companies —Hewlett-Packard, Asus, Intel, Dell, Toshiba, Netgear, D-Link, Belkin, SMC Networks, 3Com, Buffalo Technology, Microsoft, and Nintendo — on the condition that CSIRO did not broadcast the resolution.

== See also ==
- List of companies of Taiwan
