= Rack unit =

Unit of measure for equipment frames

Rack with sample component sizes including an A/V half-rack unit

A rack unit (abbreviated U or RU) is a unit of measure defined as 1 3/4 inches (44.45 mm). It is most frequently used as a measurement of the overall height of 19-inch and 23-inch rack frames, as well as the height of equipment that mounts in these frames, whereby the height of the frame or equipment is expressed as multiples of rack units. For example, a typical full-size rack cage is 42U high, while equipment is typically 1U, 2U, 3U, or 4U high.

== Definition ==
The rack unit size is based on a standard rack specification as defined in EIA-310. The Eurocard specifies a standard rack unit as the unit of height; it also defines a similar unit, horizontal pitch (HP), used to measure the width of rack-mounted equipment. The standard was adopted worldwide as IEC 60297 Mechanical structures for electronic equipment – Dimensions of mechanical structures of the 482.6 mm (19 in) series, and defines the sizes for rack, subrack (a shelf-like chassis in which cards can be inserted), and the pitch of printed circuit boards/cards providing physical compatibility of technological equipment, typically in telecommunications.

While a rack unit is defined as 1 3/4 inches (44.45 mm), a front panel or filler panel in a rack is not an exact multiple of this height. To allow space between adjacent rack-mounted components, a panel is 1/32 inch (0.031 in; 0.79 mm) less in height than the full number of rack units would imply. Thus, a 1U front panel would be 1 23/32 inches (1.719 in; 43.66 mm) tall. If n is number of rack units, the ideal formula for panel height is h = 1.750n − 0.031 for calculating in inches, and h = 44.45n − 0.79 for calculating in millimetres. Manufacturing allows for dimensions with less precision.

The 19-inch rack format with rack units of 1.75 inches (44.45 mm) was established as a standard by AT&T around 1922 in order to reduce the space required for repeater and termination equipment in a telephone company central office.

== Configurations ==
A typical full-size rack is 42U, which means it holds just over 6 feet (180 cm) of equipment, and a typical "half-height" rack is 18U–22U, which is around 3 feet (91 cm) high.

=== Mounting holes ===
A typical section of rack rail, showing rack unit distribution

The mounting-hole distance (as shown to the right) differs for 19-inch racks and 23-inch racks: 19-inch racks use uneven spacings (as shown to the right) while 23-inch racks use evenly spaced mounting holes. Although it is called a 19-inch rack unit, the actual mounting dimensions of a 19-inch rack unit are 18 5/16 inches (18.313 in; 465.14 mm) wide, center to center.

Rack units are universally the same, but the type of thread can vary depending on the rack. Mounting rails can be No. 10-32 tapped (Unified Thread Standard), No. 12-24 tapped, metric M6 threaded or universal square holes. Universal square holes are becoming the most common as these allow the insertion of replaceable cage nuts for the type of thread needed. This prevents stripping of the threading on the rails and allows for more flexibility.

=== Half-rack configurations ===
Whereas there is no formal specification for "half rack", the term half-rack can have different separate meanings: It can describe equipment that fits in a certain number of rack units, but occupies only half the width of a 19-inch rack (9.5 inches (241.30 mm)). These may be used when a piece of equipment does not require full rack width, but requires more than 1U of height. For example, a "4U half-rack" DVCAM deck occupies 4U (7 in) height × 9.5 in width, and in theory, two 4U half-rack decks could be mounted side by side and occupy the 4U space. It can also describe a unit that is 1U high and half the depth of a 4-post rack (such as a network switch, router, KVM switch, or server), such that two units can be mounted in 1U of space (one mounted at the front of the rack and one at the rear).

When used to describe the rack enclosure itself, the term "half-rack" typically means a rack enclosure that is half the height (22U tall). There is also a "half rack width" size being used in IT applications where a device conforms to a smaller than 9.5-inch width so that these "half rack width" appliances may be used in a chassis system that fits the traditional 19-inch rack space, but allows for these 8.4-inch-wide "half rack width" appliances to be inserted and removed easily without tools or the need to remove adjacent hardware. This "half rack width" concept is popular in applications where IT equipment is being used by military who are unable to use traditional 1U full-depth IT appliances due to their large size.

== See also ==
- Enclosure (electrical)
- List of unusual units of measurement
