= Horizontal pitch =

Unit used to measure the width of rack mounted equipment

Horizontal pitch (HP) is a unit of length defined by the Eurocard printed circuit board standard used to measure the horizontal width of rack mounted electronic equipment, similar to the rack unit (U) used to measure vertical heights of rack mounted equipment. One HP is 0.2 inches (5.08 mm) wide. A standard 19-inch rack is 95 HP wide of which 84 HP is typically usable. A standard 23-inch rack is 115 HP wide of which 104HP is typically usable.
