= Microsoft Broadband Networking =

Series of computer networking products

Microsoft Broadband Networking was a series of computer networking hardware products marketed by Microsoft from 2002 through 2004.

In July 2002 Microsoft product managers stated that home networking was too hard to use, and the company was developing products using the Institute of Electrical and Electronics Engineers (IEEE) 802.11b standard (sold under the Wi-Fi name). Products announced in September included the MN-500 wireless base station, MN-510 WiFi Universal Serial Bus (USB) network interface controller and MN-520 PC Card for laptop computers. The MN-500 served as a wireless access point, a router, and included an Ethernet hub with four 10/100 Ethernet ports. A five port Ethernet switch and Ethernet network interface controller cards were announced, along with kits. Reviews noted the reasonable prices and simple interface, although the configuration software would sometimes fail. One reviewer noted the 96-page book included with the base station. It was one of the first products to enable Wired Equivalent Privacy (WEP) by default, which provided at least some level of privacy. Software included a setup wizard, a broadband network utility (BNU) and an auto-update feature. According to codes in the documentation, the initial MN-510 was developed by Accton Technology Corporation. Features were similar to products of SMC Networks, a subsidiary of Accton.

By January 2003 it was estimated the products were in the number two position in US retail sales for Wi-Fi products. However market share declined by February when introduction of faster products based on IEEE 802.11g standards were delayed. Market leader Linksys was purchased by Cisco Systems in March. NetGear and D-Link also gained market share in 2003. The MN-700 model supporting 802.11g was available in September. A new PC card for 802.11g was also available. Reviews noted easy setup, but limited features compared to competitors. Microsoft discontinued the line in May 2004.
