= Catalog server =

Central point of access to search distributed network for information

A catalog server is a computer or software that acts as a repository for metadata about resources. Users can perform queries across this data.

The resources tracked by a catalog server may be files, computers, or other types of entities.
