= Cage nut =

Nut in a spring steel cage

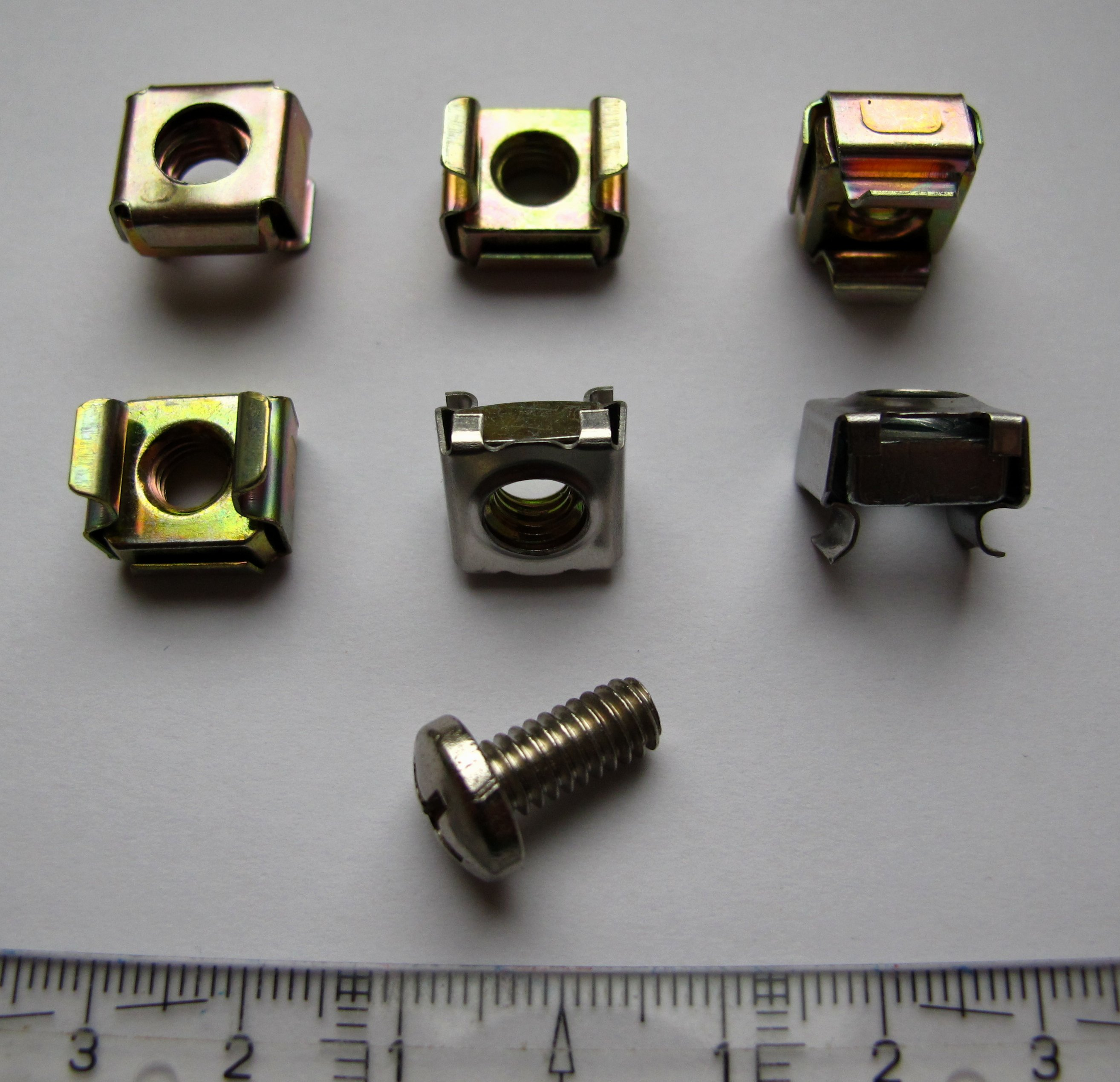
Cage nuts and a screw

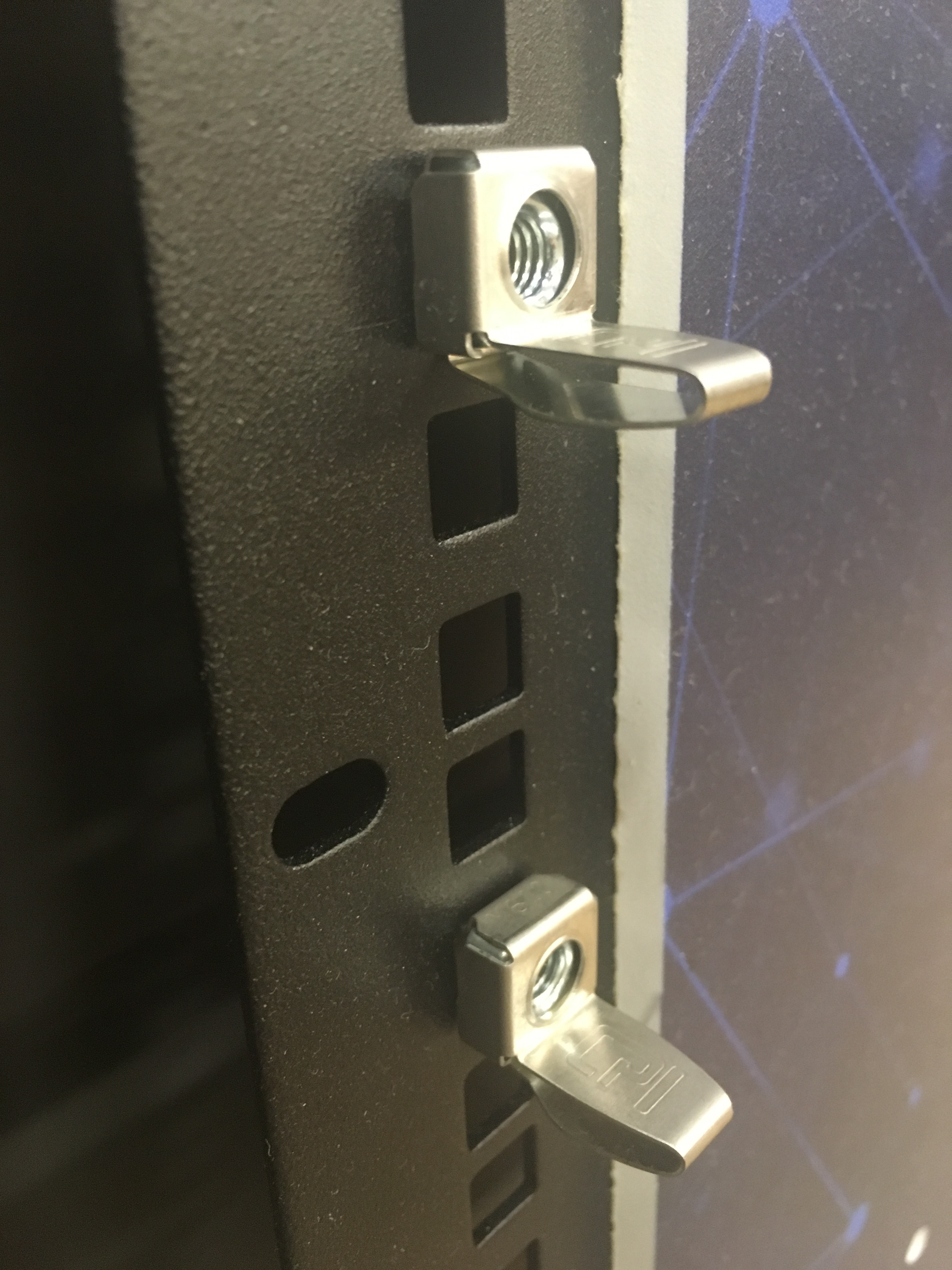
Newer designs of cage nuts eliminate the need for installation tools.

A cage nut or caged nut (also called a captive or clip nut) consists of a (usually square) nut in a spring steel cage which wraps around the nut. The cage has two wings that when compressed allow the cage to be inserted into the square holes, for example, in the mounting rails of equipment racks. When the wings are released, they hold the nut in position behind the hole. Cage nuts conforming to this description were patented in 1952 and 1953. The original design requires an insertion tool to install a cage nut into a hole. Newer designs featuring squeeze-and-release tabs allow for tool-less installation. Other newer designs even swap the nut for one or two threaded studs, which allow installers to let the equipment rest on the mounting studs as they fasten the nuts to secure the equipment.

== Usage ==
The square-hole cage nut can be used wherever a square hole can be punched. An older type of captive nut uses a spring clip that holds the nut and slides on the edge of a thin sheet. While this type of cage nut can only position the nut a fixed distance from the edge of a thin plate, it works equally well with square and round holes. A patent for such a nut was granted in 1946.

Using cage nuts provides several benefits over threaded holes. It permits a range of choice of nut and bolt size (e.g. metric vs English) in the field, long after the equipment has been manufactured. Second, if a screw is over-tightened, the nut can be replaced, unlike a pre-threaded hole, where a hole with stripped threads becomes unusable. Third, cage nuts are easy to use on materials too thin or soft to be threaded.

The nut is usually slightly loose in the cage to allow for minor adjustments in alignment. This reduces the likelihood that the threads will be stripped during equipment installation and removal. The dimensions of the spring steel clip determine thickness of the panel to which the nut may be clipped. In the case of square-hole cage nuts, the clip dimensions determine the range of hole sizes to which the clip will securely hold the nut. In the case of slide-on cage nuts, the clip dimensions determine the distance from the panel edge to the hole.

== Applications ==
A common use for cage nuts is to mount equipment in square-holed 19-inch racks (the most common type), with 0.375 inches (9.5 mm) square-hole size. There are four common sizes: UNF 10–32 and, to a lesser extent, UNC 12–24 are generally used in the United States; elsewhere, M5 (5 mm outside diameter and 0.8 mm pitch) for light and medium equipment and M6 for heavier equipment, such as servers.

Although some modern rack-mount equipment has bolt-free mounting compatible with square-hole racks, many rack-mount components are generally mounted with cage nuts.

== See also ==
- Threaded insert
