= 19-inch rack =

Standard-width frame for electronic equipment

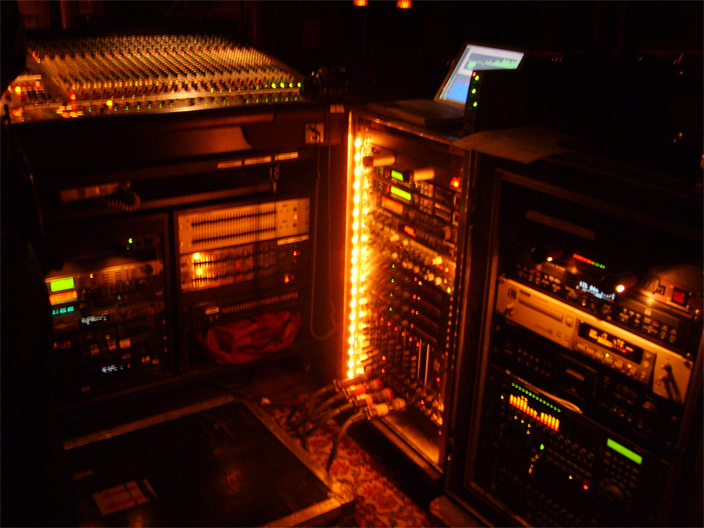
Portable 19-inch racks filled with audio processing outboard gear are a common sight at concerts with amplified sound.

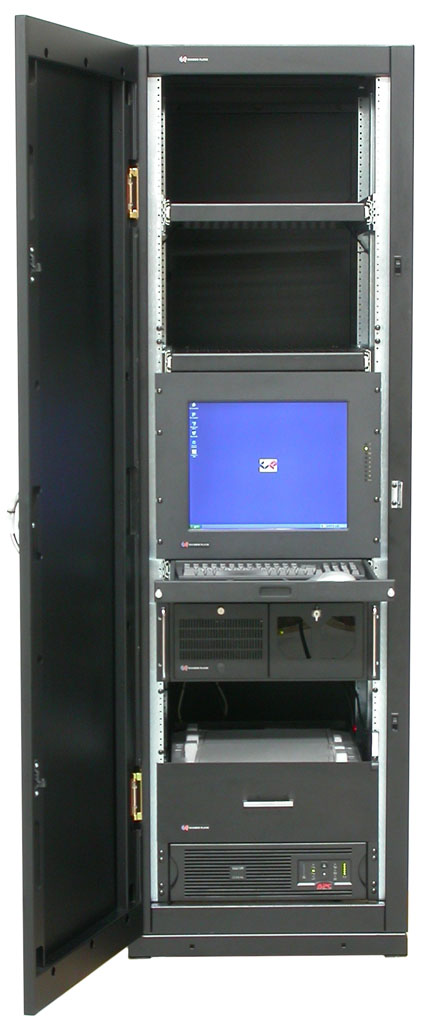
A full-height rack cabinet

A 19-inch rack is a standardized frame or enclosure for mounting multiple electronic equipment modules. Each module has a front panel that is 19 inches (482.6 mm) wide. The 19-inch dimension includes the edges or ears that protrude from each side of the equipment, allowing the module to be fastened to the rack frame with screws or bolts. Common uses include computer servers, telecommunications equipment and networking hardware, audiovisual production gear, professional audio equipment, and scientific equipment.

== Overview and history ==
Equipment designed to be placed in a rack is typically described as rack-mount/rack-mountable, a rack-mount instrument, rack-mounted system, or rack-mount chassis. The rack may include subracks or shelves. The height of the mountable equipment is standardized as multiples of 1.75 inches (44.45 mm) or one rack unit or U (less commonly RU). The industry-standard rack cabinet is 42U tall; however, many data centers have racks taller than this.

The term relay rack appeared first in the late 19th century, in the world of telephony.

By 1911, the term was also being used in railroad signaling. There is little evidence that the dimensions of these early racks were standardized.

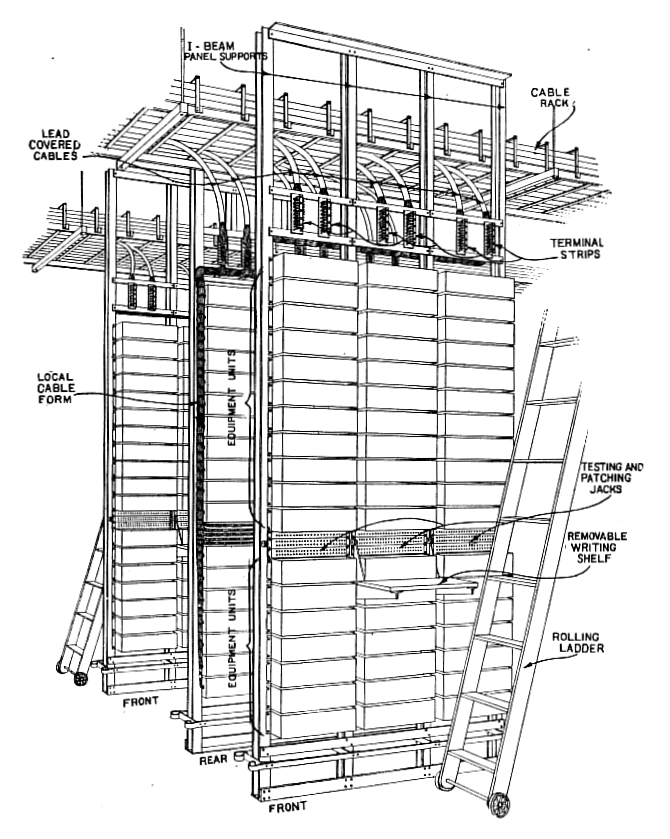
Telephone equipment racks (1923)

The 19-inch rack format with rack units of 1.75 inches (44.45 mm) was established as a standard by AT&T around 1922 in order to reduce the space required for repeater and termination equipment in a telephone company central office. The earliest repeaters from 1914 were installed in ad hoc fashion on shelves, in wooden boxes and cabinets. Once serial production started, they were built into custom-made racks, one per repeater. But in light of the rapid growth of the toll network, the engineering department of AT&T undertook a systematic redesign, resulting in a family of modular factory-assembled panels all "designed to mount on vertical supports spaced 19 1/2 inches between centers. The height of the different panels will vary,... but... in all cases to be a whole multiple of 1 3/4 inches."

By 1934, it was an established standard with holes tapped for 12-24 screws with alternating spacings of 1.25 inches (31.75 mm) and 0.5 inches (12.70 mm). The EIA standard was revised again in 1992 to comply with the 1988 public law 100-418, setting the standard U as 15.875 mm (0.625 in) + 15.875 mm (0.625 in) + 12.7 mm (0.500 in), making each U 44.45 millimetres (1.75 in).

The 19-inch rack format has remained constant while the technology that is mounted within it has changed considerably and the set of fields to which racks are applied has greatly expanded. The 19-inch (482.6 mm) standard rack arrangement is widely used throughout the telecommunications, computing, audio, video, entertainment and other industries, though the Western Electric 23-inch standard, with holes on 1-inch (25.4 mm) centers, is still used in legacy ILEC/CLEC facilities.

Nineteen-inch racks in two-post or four-post form hold most equipment in enterprise data centers, Internet service provider facilities, and professionally designed corporate server rooms, although hyperscale computing typically use wider racks. They allow for dense hardware configurations without occupying excessive floor space or requiring shelving.

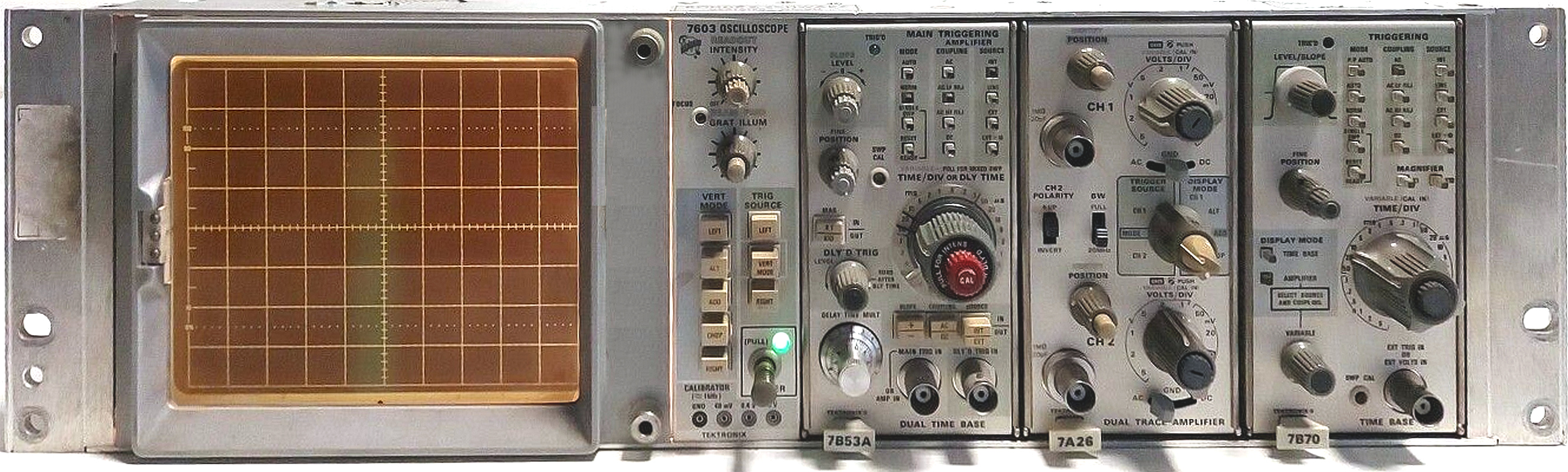
A professional-grade oscilloscope Tektronix 7603 (1970s) for use in electronics and scientific laboratories. Typically for rack-mounted devices, the width of the front panel exceeds the width of the device itself, which provides the overlap zone (including screw holes) with the left and right rack rails.

Nineteen-inch racks are also often used to house professional audio and video equipment, including amplifiers, effects units, interfaces, headphone amplifiers, and even small-scale audio mixers. A third common use for rack-mounted equipment is industrial power, control, and automation hardware.

Typically, a piece of equipment being installed has a front panel height 1/32 inch (0.031 in; 0.79 mm) less than the allotted number of Us. Thus, a 1U rackmount computer is not 1.750 inches (44.5 mm) tall but is 1.719 inches (43.7 mm) tall. If n is the number of rack units, the ideal formula for panel height is h = 1.75n − 0.031 for calculating in inches, and h = 44.45n − 0.794 for calculating in millimeters. This gap allows a bit of room above and below an installed piece of equipment so it may be removed without binding on the adjacent equipment.

== Equipment mounting ==
A typical section of 19-inch (482.6 mm) server rack rail, dimensions noted in US inch

A typical section of 19-inch (482.6 mm) server rack rail, dimensions noted in mm (exact)

=== Fastening ===
Originally, the mounting holes were tapped with a particular screw thread. When rack rails are too thin to tap, rivet nuts or other threaded inserts can be used, and when the particular class of equipment to be mounted is known in advance, some of the holes can be omitted from the mounting rails.

Threaded mounting holes in racks where the equipment is frequently changed are problematic because the threads can be damaged or the mounting screws can break off; both problems render the mounting hole unusable. Tapping large numbers of holes that may never be used is expensive; nonetheless, tapped-hole racks are still in use, generally for hardware that rarely changes. Examples include telephone exchanges, network cabling panels, broadcast studios and some government and military applications.

The tapped-hole rack was first replaced by clearance-hole (Round Hole, Round Unthreaded Holes, and Versa Rail) racks. The holes are large enough to permit a bolt to be freely inserted through without binding, and bolts are fastened in place using cage nuts. In the event of a nut being stripped out or a bolt breaking, the nut can be easily removed and replaced with a new one. Production of clearance-hole racks is less expensive.

The next innovation in rack design has been the square-hole rack. Square-hole racks allow boltless mounting, such that the rack-mounted equipment only needs to insert through and hook down into the lip of the square hole. Installation and removal of hardware in a square-hole rack is very easy and boltless, where the weight of the equipment and small retention clips are all that is necessary to hold the equipment in place. Older equipment meant for round-hole or tapped-hole racks can still be used, with the use of cage nuts made for square-hole racks.

=== Structural support ===
Rack-mountable equipment is traditionally mounted by bolting or clipping its front panel to the rack. Within the IT industry, it is common for network/communications equipment to have multiple mounting positions, including tabletop and wall mounting, so rack-mountable equipment will often feature L-brackets that must be screwed or bolted to the equipment prior to mounting in a 19-inch rack. With the prevalence of 23-inch racks in the Telecoms industry, the same practice is also common, but with equipment having 19-inch and 23-inch brackets available, enabling them to be mounted in existing racks.

A key structural weakness of front-mounted support is the bending stress placed on the mounting brackets of the equipment and the rack itself. As a result, 4-post racks have become common, featuring a mirrored pair of rear mounting posts. Since the spacing between the front and rear mounting posts may differ between rack vendors and/or the configuration of the rack (some racks may incorporate front and rear rails that may be moved forward and backward, e.g., APC SX-range racks), it is common for equipment that features 4-post mounting brackets to have an adjustable rear bracket.

Servers and deep pieces of equipment are often mounted using rails that are bolted to the front and rear posts (as above, it is common for such rails to have an adjustable depth), allowing the equipment to be supported by four posts, while also enabling it to be easily installed and removed.

Although there is no standard for the depth of equipment, nor specifying the outer width and depth of the rack enclosure itself (incorporating the structure, doors and panels that contain the mounting rails), there is a tendency for 4-post racks to be 600 mm (23.62 in) or 800 mm (31.50 in) wide, and for them to be 600 mm (23.62 in), 800 mm (31.50 in) or 1,010 mm (39.76 in) deep. This, of course, varies by manufacturer, the design of the rack and its purpose, but through common constraining factors (such as raised-floor tile dimensions), these dimensions have become quite common. The extra width and depth enable cabling to be routed with ease (also helping to maintain the minimum bend radius for fiber and copper cables) and deeper equipment to be utilized. A common feature in IT racks is mounting positions for zero-U accessories, such as power distribution units (PDUs) and vertical cable managers and ducts, that utilize the space between the rear rails and the side of the rack enclosure.

The strength required of the mounting posts means they are invariably not merely flat strips but actually a wider folded strip arranged around the corner of the rack. The posts are usually made of steel of around 2 mm thickness (the official standard recommends a minimum of 1.9 mm), or of slightly thicker aluminum.

Racks, especially two-post racks, are often secured to the floor or adjacent building structure so as not to fall over. This is usually required by local building codes in seismic zones. According to Telcordia Technologies Generic Requirements document GR-63-CORE, during an earthquake, telecommunications equipment is subjected to motions that can over-stress the equipment framework, circuit boards, and connectors. The amount of motion and resulting stress depends on the structural characteristics of the building and framework in which the equipment is contained and the severity of the earthquake. Seismic racks rated according to GR-63, NEBS Requirements: Physical Protection, are available, with Zone 4 representing the most demanding environment.

GR-3108, Generic Requirements for Network Equipment in the Outside Plant (OSP), specifies the usable opening of seismic-compliant 19-inch racks.

=== Rails (slides) ===
Heavy equipment or equipment that is commonly accessed for servicing, for which attaching or detaching at all four corners simultaneously would pose a problem, is often not mounted directly onto the rack but instead is mounted via rails (or slides). A pair of rails is mounted directly onto the rack, and the equipment then slides into the rack along the rails, which support it. When in place, the equipment may also then be bolted to the rack. The rails may also be able to fully support the equipment in a position where it has been slid clear of the rack; this is useful for inspection or maintenance of equipment, which will then be slid back into the rack. Some rack slides even include a tilt mechanism allowing easy access to the top or bottom of rack-mounted equipment when it is fully extended from the rack.

Slides or rails for computers and other data processing equipment, such as disk arrays or routers, often need to be purchased directly from the equipment manufacturer, as there is no standardization on such equipment's thickness (measurement from the side of the rack to the equipment) or means for mounting to the rail.

A rails kit may include a cable management arm (CMA), which folds the cables attached to the server and allows them to expand neatly when the server is slid out, without being disconnected.

=== Computer mounting ===
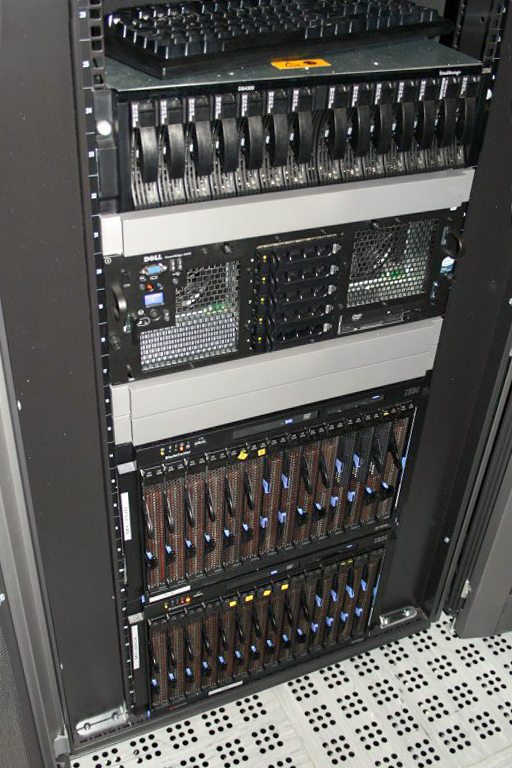
Example of 19-inch computer rack with servers

Computer servers designed for rack-mounting can include a number of extra features to make the server easy to use in the rack:

- The sliding rails can lock in various extended positions to prevent the equipment from moving when extended out from the rack for service.
- The server itself might have locking pins on the sides that just drop into slots on the extended rail assembly, in a manner similar to a removable kitchen drawer. This permits very easy server installation and removal since there is no need for the server to be held in midair while someone fastens each rail to the sides of the server with screws.
- Some manufacturers of rack-mount hardware include a folding cable tray behind the server, so that the cables are held in a neat and tidy folded channel when inside the rack, but can unfold out into a long strip when pulled out of the rack, allowing the server to continue to be plugged in and operating normally even while fully extended and hanging in mid-air in front of the rack. This piece of equipment thus simplifies maintenance, but at the cost of providing a restriction to airflow.
- Rack-optimized servers might duplicate indicator lights on the front and rear of the rack to help identify a machine needing attention or provide separate identify LED indicators on both sides of the server (which can be turned on in software or by pushing an associated button). Since some configurations permit over fifty 1U servers in a single rack, this provides a simple method to determine exactly which machine is having a problem when at the rear of the rack.
- A handle may be provided at the rear of the server rails to help pull or push the server without having to pull on the cables.

When there is a large number of computers in a single rack, it is impractical for each one to have its own separate keyboard, mouse, and monitor. Instead, a KVM switch or LOM software is used to share a single keyboard/video/mouse set amongst many different computers.

Since the mounting hole arrangement is vertically symmetric, it is possible to mount rack-mountable equipment upside-down. However, not all equipment is suitable for this type of mounting. For instance, most optical disc players will not work upside-down because the driving motor mechanism does not grip the disc.

== Rack types ==
A standard 19-inch server rack cabinet is typically 42u in height, 600 millimetres (24 in) wide, and 36 inches (914.40 mm) deep. This comprises a volume of 974 L, or just under a cubic meter. Newer server rack cabinets come with adjustable mounting rails, allowing the user to place the rails at a shorter depth if needed. There are a multitude of specialty server racks, including soundproof server racks, air-conditioned server racks, NEMA-rated, seismic-rated, open frame, narrow, and even miniature 19-inch racks for smaller applications. Cabinets are generally sized to be no wider than the standard 24-inch-wide (610 mm) floor tiles used in most data centers.

Racks carrying telecom equipment like routers and switches often have extra width to accommodate the many cables on the sides.

=== Four-post cabinet racks ===
Four-post racks allow for mounting rails to support the equipment at the front and rear. These racks may be open in construction without sides or doors or may be enclosed by front and/or rear doors, side panels, and tops. Most data centers use four-post racks.

==== Two-post relay racks ====
Two-post racks provide two vertical posts. These posts are typically heavy-gauge metal or extruded aluminum. A top bar and wide foot connect the posts and allow the rack to be securely attached to the floor and/or roof for seismic safety. Equipment can be mounted either close to its center of gravity (to minimize load on its front panel), or via the equipment's front panel holes. The Relay Racks name comes from early two-post racks which housed telephone relay and switching equipment. Two-post racks are most often used for telecommunication installations.

=== ATA road case racks ===
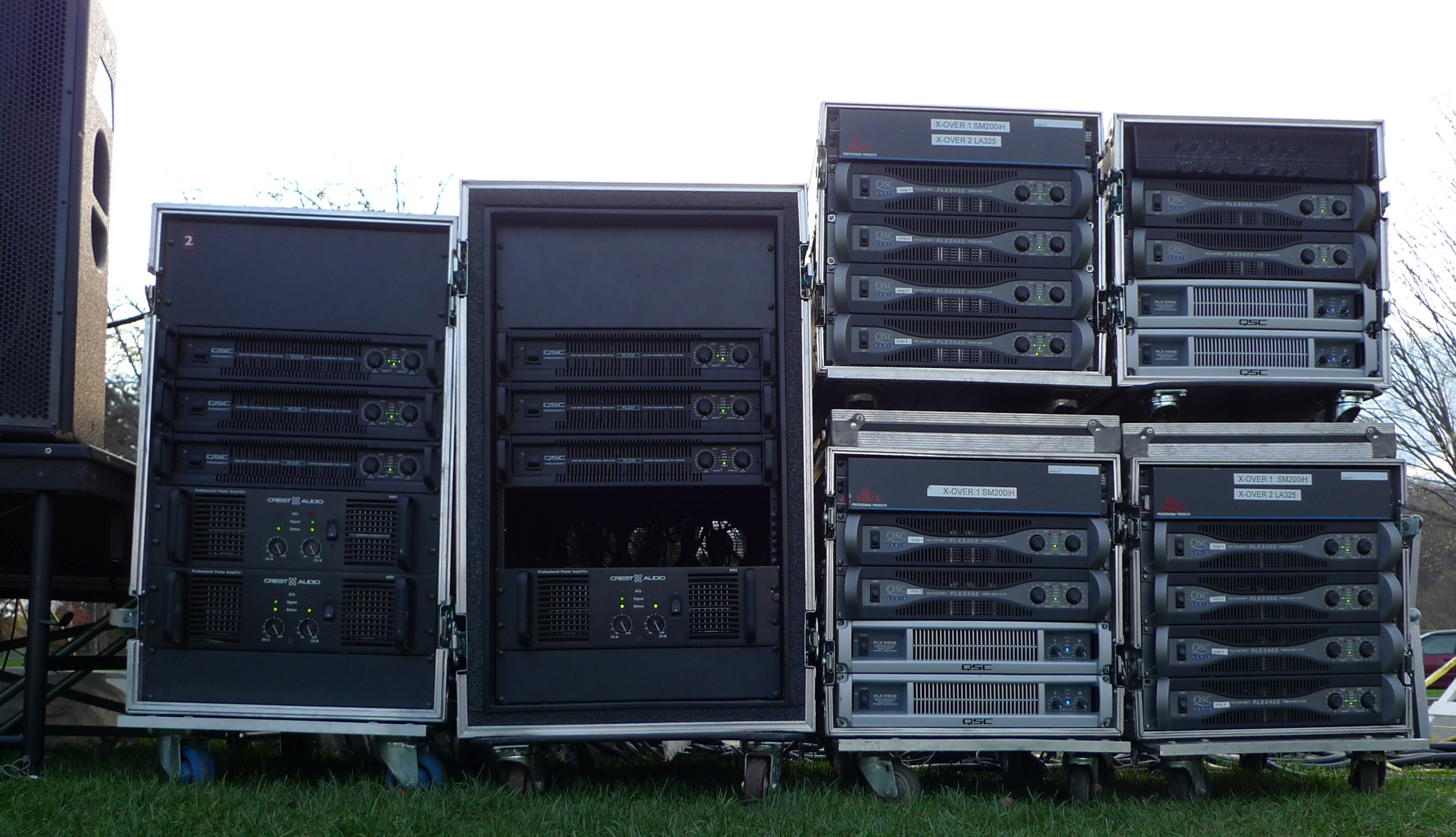
Rack-mounted audio power amplifiers of a sound reinforcement system. The racks each have large, heavy-duty rollers. This is typical for relatively impromptu venues such as open-air concerts.

19-inch equipment that needs to be moved often or protected from harsh treatment can be housed in a road case approved by the Air Transport Association of America (ATA), sometimes also referred to as a flight case. Road cases typically have plywood sides laminated with polyvinyl chloride (PVC), extruded aluminum edges, steel corners, handles, and latches. Larger cases typically have wheels for easy transport. Road case racks come in different heights based on the 1U standard and different depths. Non-isolated cases simply mount 19-inch mounting posts inside the case. To protect equipment from shock and vibration, road rack cases use an inner and outer case. These cases can be isolated by thick layers of foam or may use spring-loaded shock mounting. Touring musicians, theatrical productions and sound and light companies use road case racks.

Rack strips used for road cases come in 2 types: single angle and double angle. Double-angle rack strips offer better structural strength and an additional mounting face for cable management or additional support for heavy equipment.

=== Fiberglass-reinforced plastic case racks ===
In 1965, a durable fiber-reinforced plastic 19-inch rackmount case was patented by ECS Composites and became widely used in military and commercial applications for electronic deployment and operation. Rackmount cases are also constructed of thermo-stamped composite, carbon fiber, and DuPont's Kevlar for military and commercial uses.

==== Polyethylene molded case racks ====
Portable rack cases using a rotary-molded polyethylene outer shell are a lower-cost alternative to the more durable ATA-approved case. These cases are marketed to musicians and entertainers for equipment not subject to frequent transportation and rough handling. The polyethylene shell is not fiberglass reinforced and is not rigid. The shape of small cases is maintained by the rack rails and the cover seal extrusions alone. Larger cases are further reinforced with additional plywood or sheet metal. The outer shell is frequently embossed in a self-mating pattern to combat the tendency for stacked cases to deform slightly, creating a slope that encourages the upper case to slide off. The cases typically use extruded aluminum bands at the ends of the body with tongue-and-groove mating to like bands for the covers. End covers are typically secured with either a simple draw latch or a rotary cam butterfly latch, named for the shape of the twist handle.

== Cooling ==
There is no standard for airflow and cooling of rack-mounted equipment. A variety of airflow patterns can be found, including front intakes and rear exhausts, as well as side intakes and exhausts. Low-wattage devices may not employ active cooling, but use only passive thermal radiation and convection to dissipate heat.

For rack-mounted computer servers, devices generally intake air on the front and exhaust on the rear. This prevents circular airflows where hot exhaust air is recirculated through an adjacent device and causes overheating.

Although open-frame racks are the least expensive, they also expose air-cooled equipment to dust, lint, and other environmental contamination. An enclosed, sealed cabinet with forced air fans permits air filtration to protect equipment from dust.

Large server rooms will often group rack cabinets together so that racks on both sides of an aisle are either front-facing or rear-facing, which simplifies cooling by supplying cool air to the front of the racks and collecting hot air from the rear of the racks. These aisles may themselves be enclosed in a cold air containment tunnel so that cooling air does not travel to other parts of the building where it is not needed or mixes with hot air, making it less efficient. Raised or false floor cooling in server rooms can serve a similar purpose; they permit cooling airflow to equipment through the underfloor space to the underside of enclosed rack cabinets.

A difficulty with forced-air fan cooling in rack equipment is that fans can fail due to age or dust. The fans themselves can be difficult to replace. In the case of network equipment, it may be necessary to unplug 50 or more cables from the device, remove the device from the rack, and then disassemble the device chassis to replace the fans.

However, some rack equipment has been designed to make fan replacement easy, using quick-change fan trays that can be accessed without removing the cabling or the device from the rack, and in some cases without turning off the device so that operation is uninterrupted during replacement.

== Specifications ==
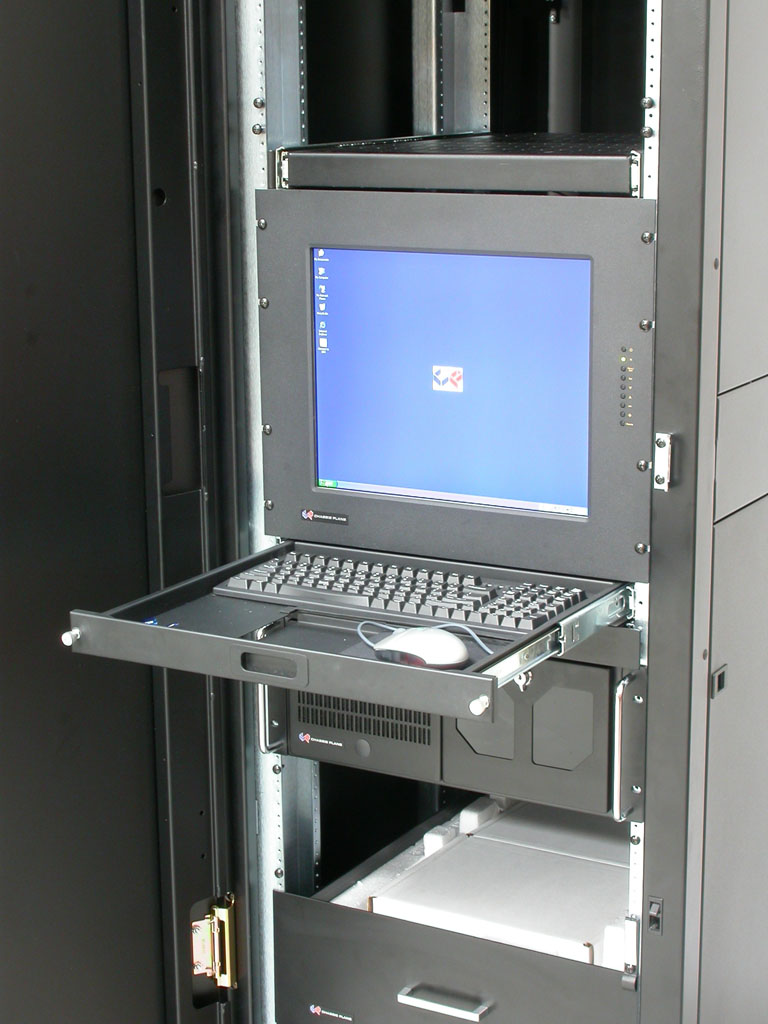
Computer keyboard and monitor mounted on a sliding tray in a rack

The formal standards for a 19-inch (482.6 mm) rack are available from the following:

- Electronic Industries Alliance EIA-310-D, Cabinets, Racks, Panels, and Associated Equipment, dated September 1992. (Latest Standard Now REV E 1996)
- Consumer Electronics Association CEA-310-E design requirements for Cabinets, Panels, Racks and Subracks., dated December 14, 2005
- International Electrotechnical Commission - Multiple documents are available in French and English versions.
  - IEC 60297 Mechanical structures for electronic equipment - Dimensions of mechanical structures of the 482,6 mm (19 in) series
    - IEC 60297-1 Replaced by IEC 60297–3–100
    - IEC 60297-2 Replaced by IEC 60297–3–100
    - IEC 60297-3-100 Part 3-100: Basic dimensions of front panels, subracks, chassis, racks and cabinets
    - IEC 60297-3-101 Part 3-101: Subracks and associated plug-in units
    - IEC 60297-3-102 Part 3-102: Injector/extractor handle
    - IEC 60297-3-103 Part 3-103: Keying and alignment pin
    - IEC 60297-3-104 Part 3-104: Connector dependent interface dimensions of subracks and plug-in units
    - IEC 60297-3-105 Part 3-105: Dimensions and design aspects for 1U chassis
    - IEC 60297-4 Replaced by IEC 60297–3–102
    - IEC 60297-5 Multiple documents, -100, 101, 102, ... 107, replaced by IEC 60297–3–101
- Deutsches Institut für Normung DIN 41494 - Multiple documents in German but some documents are available in English.
  - DIN 41494 Equipment practices for electronic equipment; mechanical structures of the 482,6 mm (19 inch) series
    - DIN 41494-7 Dimensions of cabinets and suites of racks.
    - DIN 41494-8 Components on front panels; mounting conditions, dimensions
    - DIN IEC 60297-3-100 (see above in IEC section)

A rack's mounting fixture consists of two parallel metal strips (also referred to as posts or panel mounts) standing vertically. The posts are each 0.625 inches (15.88 mm) wide, and are separated by a gap of 17.75 inches (450.85 mm), giving an overall rack width of 19 inches (482.60 mm). The posts have holes in them at regular intervals, with both posts matching, so that each hole is part of a horizontal pair with a center-to-center distance of 18.28–18.34 inches (464.2–465.8 mm).

The holes in the posts are arranged vertically in repeating sets of three, with center-to-center separations of 0.5, 0.625, 0.625 inches (12.70, 15.88, 15.88 mm). The hole pattern thus repeats every 1.75 inches (44.45 mm).

Holes so arranged can either be tapped (usually 10-32 UNF thread, or, less often, 6mm metric) or have square holes for cage nuts.

=== Rack unit ===
Racks are vertically divided into regions, 44.45 millimetres (1.75 in) in height. Each region has three complete hole pairs on each side. The holes are centered at 6.35 millimetres (0.25 in), 22.25 millimetres (0.88 in), and 38.1 millimetres (1.50 in) from the top or bottom of the region. Such a region is commonly known as a U, for unit, RU for rack unit or, in German, HE, for Höheneinheit. Heights within racks are measured by this unit. Rack-mountable equipment is usually designed to occupy some integer number of U. For example, an oscilloscope might be 4U high. Rack-mountable computers and servers are mostly between 1U and 4U high. A blade server enclosure might require 10U.

Occasionally, one may see fractional U devices, such as a 1.5U server or devices that are just 22.5 or 15 cm in width, allowing for 2 or 3 such devices to be installed side by side, but these are much less common.

The height of a rack can vary from a few inches, such as in a broadcast console, to a floor-mounted rack whose interior is 45 rack units (200.2 centimetres or 78.82 inches) high. 42U is a common configuration. Many wall-mounted enclosures for industrial equipment use 19-inch racks.

== Related standards ==
=== 10-inch rack ===
Comparison between 10-inch and 19-inch rack dimensions

Some telecommunications and networking equipment is available in a narrower 10-inch format with the same unit height as a standard 19-inch rack. This standard is also gaining in popularity with hobbyists with limited space at their disposal.

=== 11-foot frame ===
Frames for holding rotary-dial telephone equipment, such as step-by-step telephone switches, were generally 11 feet 6 inches (3.51 m) high. A series of studies led to the adoption of frames 7 feet (2.1 m) high, with modular widths in multiples of 1 foot 1 inch (0.33 m)—most often 2 feet 2 inches (0.66 m) wide.

=== ETSI rack ===
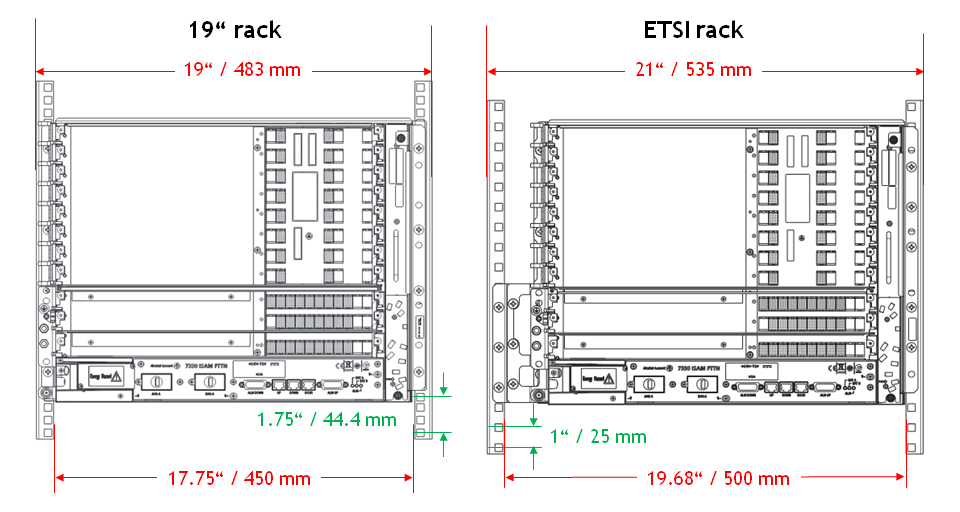
Comparison between 19-inch and ETSI rack dimensions

The ETSI rack is defined by the European Telecommunications Standards Institute (ETS 300 119). The distance of the right edge of the right mounting rail to the left edge of the left mounting rail is 535 millimetres (21.1 in). As 535 mm is very close to 21 inches, these racks are sometimes called 21-inch racks. The gap between the posts is 500 millimetres (19.69 in). As 19-inch equipment has a maximum width of 17 1/4 inches (438.15 mm), it can easily be mounted in an ETSI rack by means of an ETSI bracket or adapter plate.

In contrast to the 19-inch standards, ETSI also defined the size of the rack enclosure: the four allowed widths are 150, 300, 600, 900 millimetres (5.9, 11.8, 23.6, 35.4 in) and two allowed depths are 300 and 600 millimetres (12 and 24 in). Hole spacing is 25 millimetres (0.98 in).

=== 23-inch rack ===
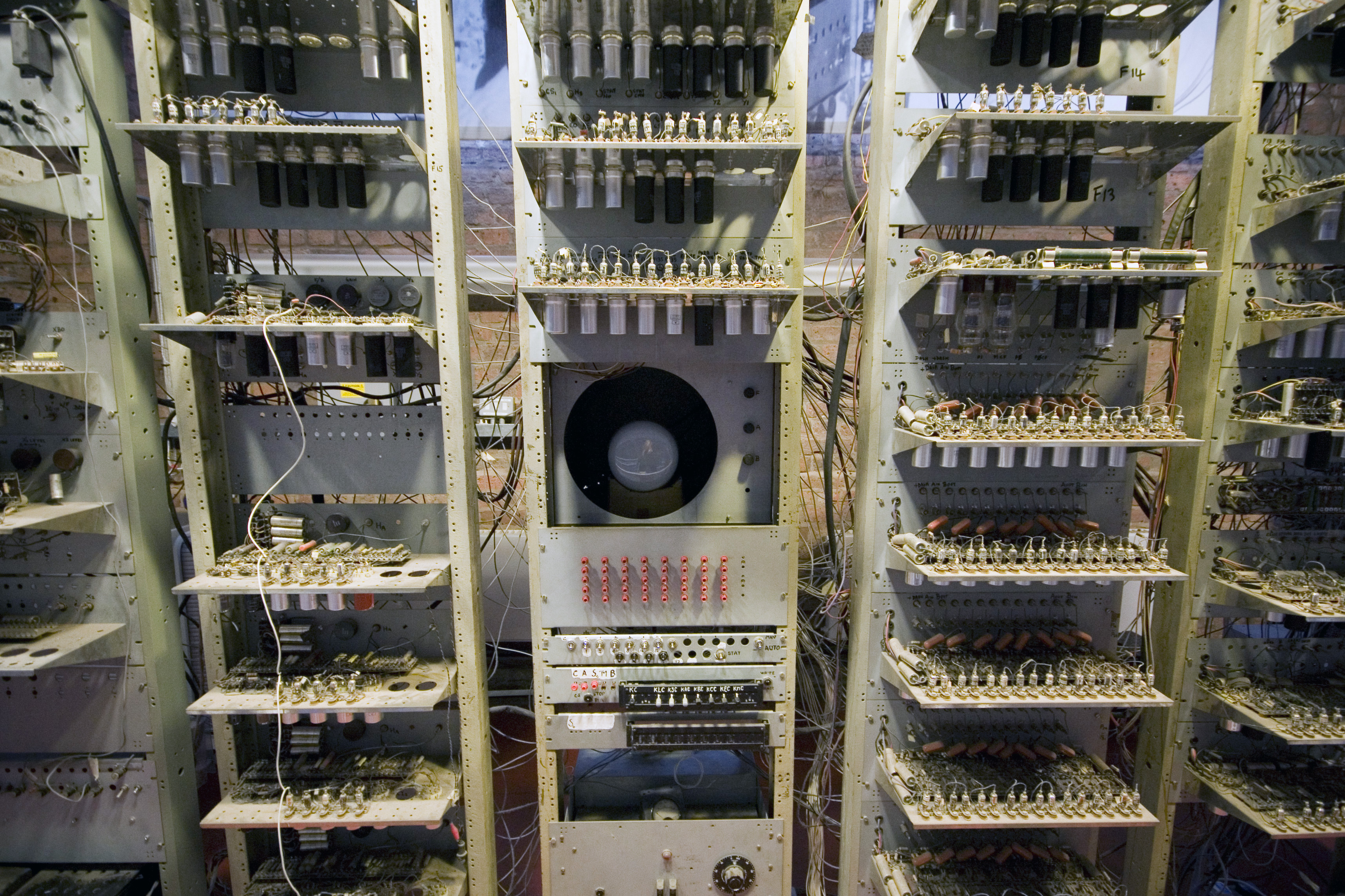
The 1948 original Manchester Baby and the 1998 working replica (pictured) were mounted on 23-inch racking.

A 23-inch (580 mm) rack is used for housing telephone (primarily), computer, audio and other equipment – although it is less common than the 19-inch rack. The size denotes the width of the faceplate for the installed equipment. The rack unit is a measure of vertical spacing and is common to both the 19 and 23-inch racks.

Hole spacing is either on 1-inch (25 mm) centers (Western Electric standard), or the same as for 19-inch (482.6 mm) racks (0.625 in or 15.9 mm spacing).

=== Open Rack ===
Open Rack is a mounting system designed by the Open Compute Project that has the same outside dimensions as typical 19-inch racks (e.g., 600 mm width), but internally supports wider equipment modules of 547 millimetres (21.5 in).

=== OpenVPX ===
OpenVPX is an industry standard for modules that can be installed in a chassis in defense applications. The modules can provide a variety of functions, similar to equipment in a rack.

=== Eurorack ===
Eurorack is a standard generally used in electronic music production to install components of a modular synthesizer, an electronic music instrument. This is achieved with a rack-mounting system specific to the standard.

=== Eurocard ===
Eurocard is an IEEE standard format for printed circuit board (PCB) cards that can be plugged together into a standard chassis, which, in turn, can be mounted in a 19-inch rack. The chassis consists of a series of slotted card guides on the top and bottom, into which the cards are slid so they stand on end, like books on a shelf. At the spine of each card is one or more connectors which plug into mating connectors on a backplane that closes the rear of the chassis. Several standards such as VMEbus (Versa Module Eurocard bus), STEbus, PCI eXtensions for Instrumentation, openGear and others were developed, which share goals with Eurocard.

== Gallery ==
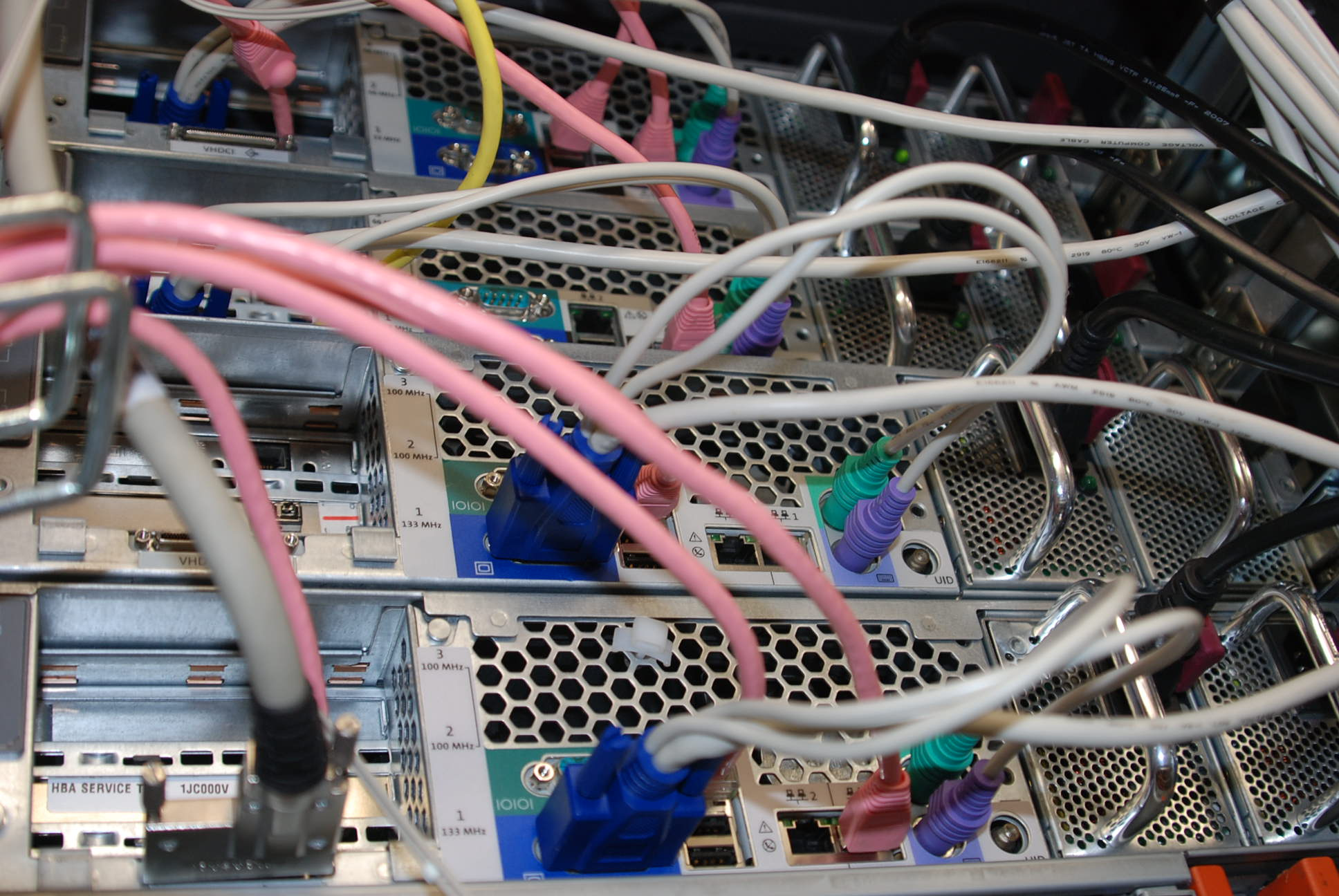
A server rack seen from the rear

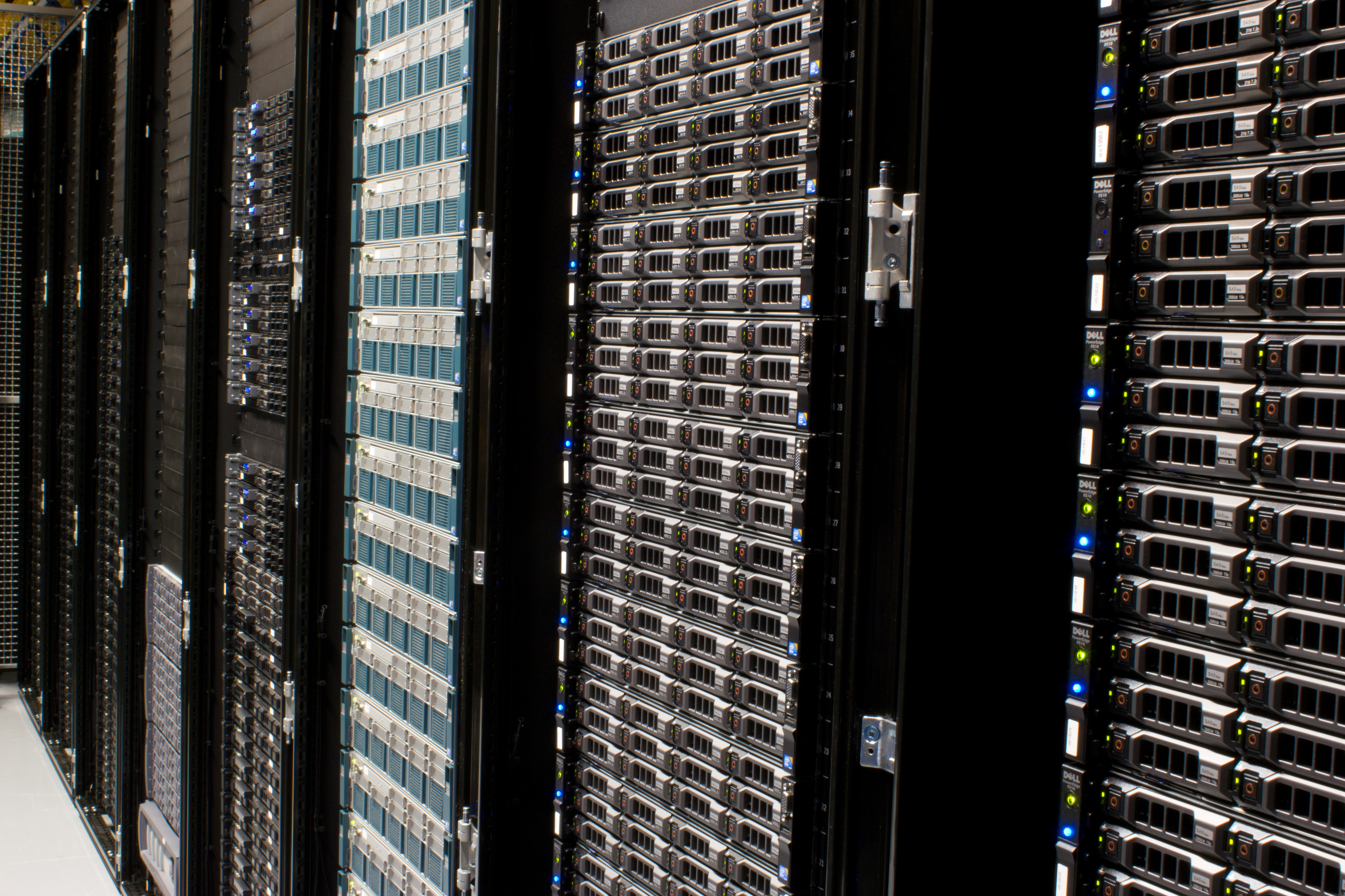
Wikimedia Foundation servers as seen from the front

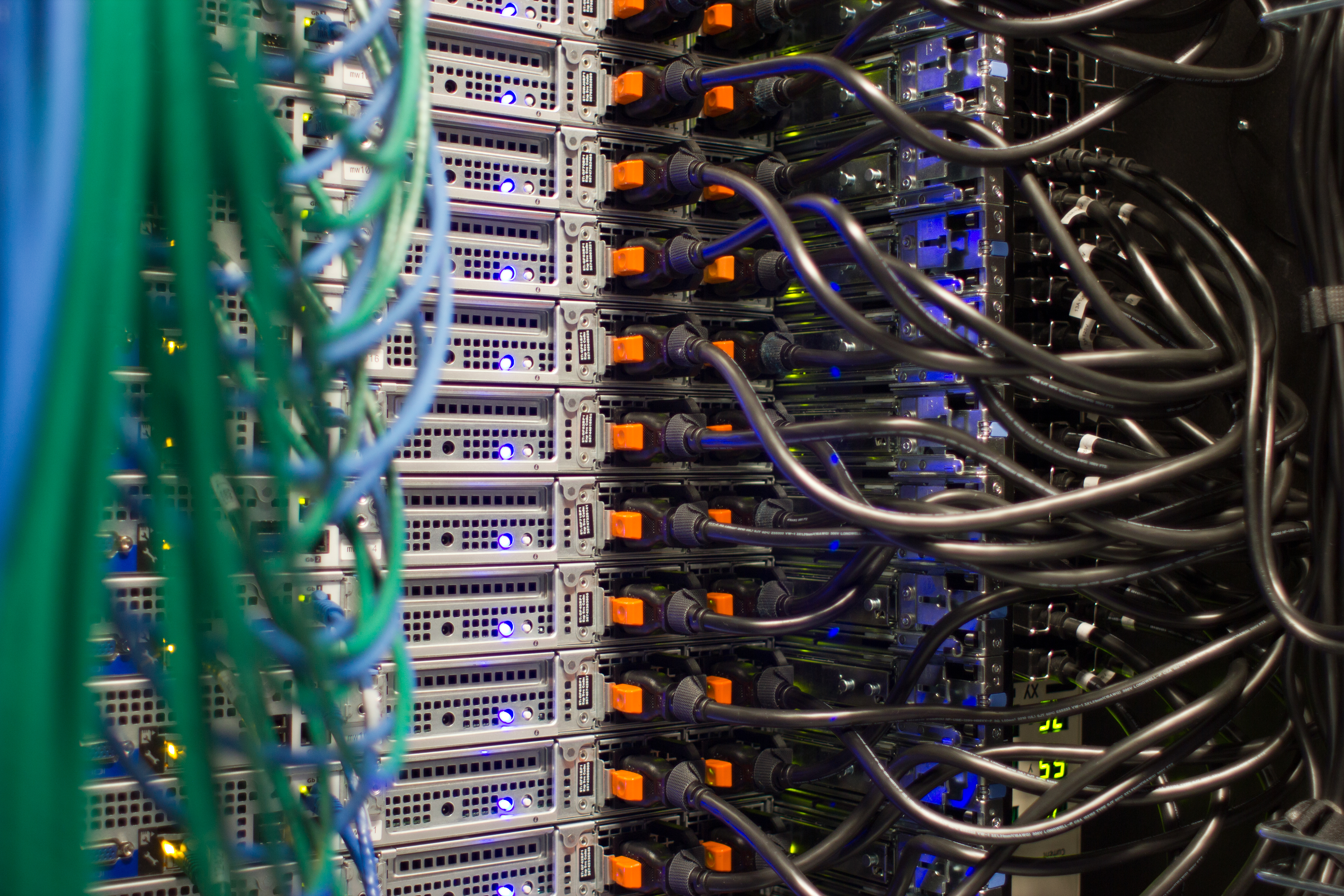
Wikimedia Foundation servers as seen from the rear

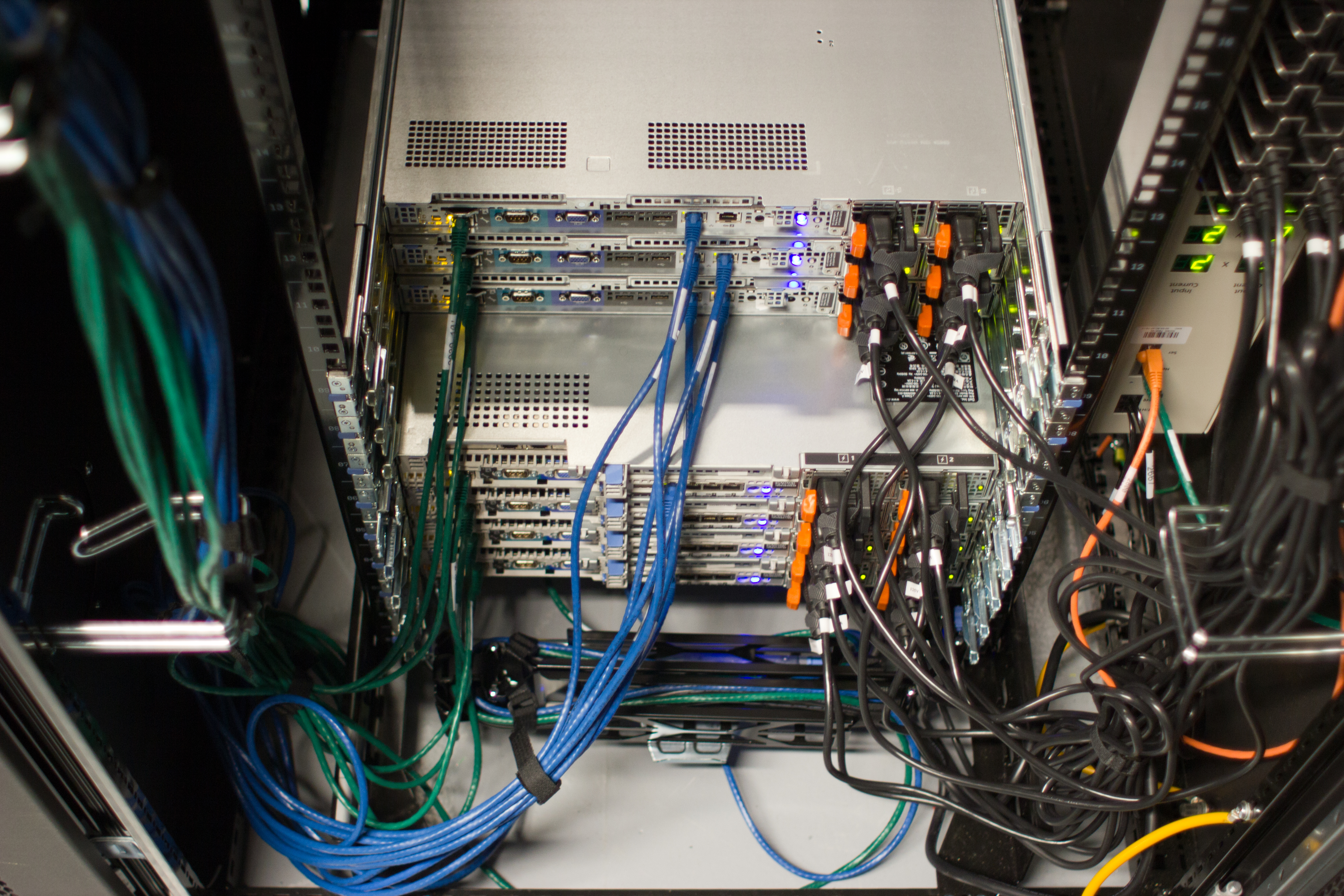
Wikimedia Foundation servers as seen from the rear

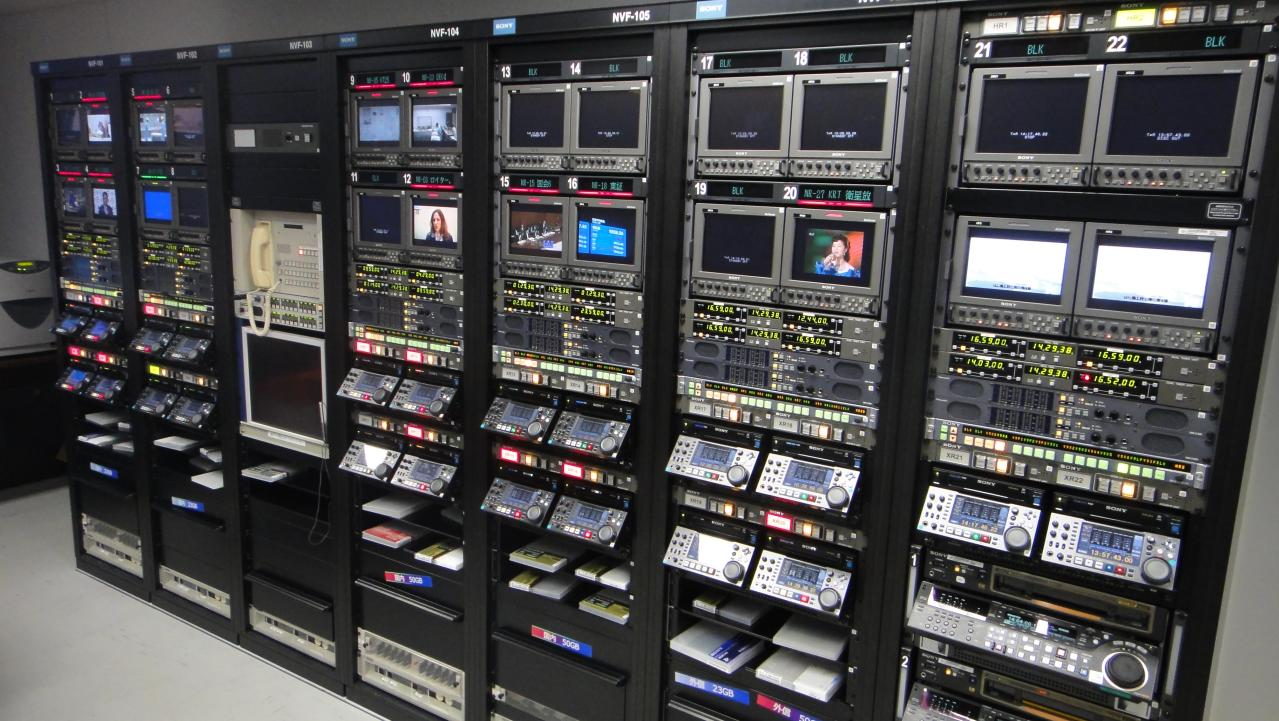
19-inch racks with video equipment

== See also ==
- Data center
- Horizontal pitch
- Rack unit
- Transit case, for rack cases
- Open Compute Project, wider, deeper rack design
