= Open Rack =

Rack meant to replace 19-inch racks in data centers

Open Rack is an Open Compute Project standard for a rack and power delivery architecture as an efficient, scalable alternative to the EIA-310 19-inch rack. It is designed specifically for large-scale cloud deployments.

There are several key design features intended to make equipment more efficient to deploy, support, and operate:

- The power to all of the compute, storage, or network devices is supplied by a pair of busbars located in the rear of the rack. The bus bars are supplied with 48 V DC by a shelf of power supplies, which provides efficient conversion from the local (usually three-phase) AC mains supply.
- The IT equipment that fits into Open Rack is 537 mm (nominally 21 inches) wide and 48 millimetres (1 7/8 in) tall. This is a 20% increase in frontal area that provides more airflow to the IT devices, helping data centers to reduce cooling costs. The vertical spacing is also taller, to accommodate better airflow and enclosures with improved physical designs that do not sag and interfere with adjacent equipment.
- All cables and interconnects are accessed from the front of the rack and the IT equipment is hot-pluggable and serviceable from the front of the rack. Service personnel no longer access the rear of the rack or need to work in the hot aisle.

== Specification ==
=== OpenU ===
Open Rack rack units, also called OpenU or just OU, measure 48 mm in height and describe how tall a rack or piece of equipment is, similar to U when referring to traditional 19-inch racks. For example, a "2OU server" measures 96 millimetres (3 3/4 in) in height.

An Open Rack consists of three modular zones: power, equipment, and cable.

To maintain compatibility with existing server infrastructure, OU cabinets are the same 24-inch (610 mm) external width as conventional server cabinets. However, an OpenU is slightly taller, to improve airflow and cable management.

==== Equipment bay ====
An equipment bay is 21 inches or 533 millimetres wide. An equipment bay rests on support shelves and blind-mates with the power supply through busbars.

=== Open Rack Wide ===
In April 2026, as part of a larger Open Data Center Ecosystem for AI announcement, OCP announced Open Rack Wide (ORW), a specification for large format gear racks beyond the original Open Rack specification.
