= Onie, West Virginia =

Onie
- Unincorporated community
- Location within the state of West Virginia Onie (the United States)
- Coordinates: 39°37′11″N 80°37′51″W
- Country: United States
- State: West Virginia
- County: Wetzel
- Elevation: 902 ft (275 m)
- Time zone: UTC-5 (Eastern (EST))
  - Summer (DST): UTC-4 (EDT)
- GNIS ID: 1717809

Onie was an unincorporated community in Wetzel County, West Virginia. It was also known as Unie.

Near Wileyville, Onie was located at the mouth of Honey Run which is a tributary of Little Fishing Creek. Although this town appeared on a few maps, Onie disappeared shortly after it first appeared. According to local memories, Onie had a bar, a blacksmith, and a hotel.

Around 1900, Onie was an oil boom town. Oil production peaked in West Virginia by 1900, when the state ranked second in oil production, and Onie declined after that. As of 2008, East Resources still had a field office and wells at this location, but the fields had been used for hay instead of oil for a long time after Onie vanished.
