= Cumulus Networks =

American software company

- Type: Subsidiary
- Industry: Networking software, Cloud Networking
- Founded: January 2010; 16 years ago
- Founders: JR Rivers; Nolan Leake
- Headquarters: Mountain View, California, US
- Key people: Josh Leslie (CEO)
- Products: Operating System for Switches
- Parent: Nvidia
- Website: cumulusnetworks.com

Cumulus Networks was a computer software company headquartered in Mountain View, California, US. The company designed and sold a Linux operating system for network switches, along with management software use in enterprise environments.

In May 2020, American semiconductor manufacturer Nvidia announced it was acquiring Cumulus.

== Background ==
Cumulus Networks was founded by JR Rivers and Nolan Leake in 2010. The company raised a first round of seed funding in 2012. Cumulus Networks emerged publicly in June 2013 after previously operating in stealth mode.

In 2014 Dell began offering the option of the Cumulus Linux network OS on Dell's switches.

In 2015, Hewlett Packard Enterprise (HPE) began offering the option of Cumulus Linux on HPE's switches.

In 2016, Mellanox began offering Cumulus Linux on their Spectrum switches.

In 2018, Lenovo began offering Cumulus Linux on their ThinkSystem Rackswitch line of switches.

On June 20, 2019, the company announced the departure of co-founder JR Rivers, who had been the original CEO and, since March 2016, the CTO. According to the company's website, neither Rivers nor Leake remain on the Board of Directors.

In January 2020, Hewlett Packard announced a partnership with Cumulus to include Cumulus' Linux NetQ software on HPE's network storage products.

In May 2020, Nvidia Corporation announced plans to acquire Cumulus Networks for an undisclosed amount.

== Products ==
=== Cumulus Linux ===
Cumulus Linux was their open Linux-based networking operating system for bare metal switches. It's been based on the Debian Linux distribution.

In a 2017 Gartner report Cumulus Networks was highlighted as a pioneer of open source networking for developing an open source networking operating system in a market where hardware vendors usually delivered proprietary operating systems pre-installed. According to Gartner, Cumulus Networks had worked around the lack of vendor support for open source networking by deploying bare metal switches with the Cumulus Linux operating system in large corporate networks. 32 percent of the Fortune 50 companies used the Cumulus Linux operating system in their data centers in 2017.
