= Furniture screw =

Type of fastener used on furniture

Two wood screws of equal length, but different thread length. Wood screws are a common type of screw in furniture.

A furniture screw can refer to any type of screw (and sometimes nut) used on furniture. Different types of screws have different uses in furniture.

According to a 1986 article in New York Times, screws on old furniture can be difficult to remove due to rust.

== Head types ==
Furniture screws come with many different types of screw heads. In older times, screws with slotted heads were often used in furniture, but these types of screw heads are usually avoided in modern furniture in favor of more practical tool slots. Popular options in the 2020s include Phillips, Torx and hex heads.

== Wood screws ==
Wood screws are common in furniture in general, and for furniture uses they typically have diameters between 3.5 mm and 5 mm (#6/0.1380 in to #10/0.1900 in).

A Chinese study published in 2019 which compared different types of screws used in medium density fiberboards (MDF) for furniture purposes found that the most important factor for how well a screw worked was the depth of the screw, and secondly the diameter of the hole. The screw type itself, however, had the least effect on the strength of the joint.

== Special furniture screws ==
Some common types of specialty furniture screws and bolts, especially on seen ready-to-assemble furniture, are:

- Barrel nut, a type of nut which has threads perpendicular to the cylinder axis
- Cam fastener, used to assemble knockdown furniture
- Confirmat screw, functions like a steel dowel, often comes with ready-to-assemble furniture made from MDF or other particle boards
- Insert nut, a type of en type of threaded insert for wood
- Sex bolt, a type of nut with a low shoulder (flange) to provide resistance with little protrusion
- T-nut, a nut that can be knocked into the back of a wood plate to provide a screw mounting hole
- Wood hanger screw, a screw with machine threads in one end, and wood screw threads in the other

=== Knock-down fastener ===
Knock-down fasteners are a class of fasteners designed to allow for repeated assembly and disassembly. They are often used in flat pack furniture, which is typified by items such as book cases and wall units that come in a package of pre-cut and pre-drilled components ready to assemble by a novice. Knock-down fasteners can generally be assembled with a single driver, such as a hex key, which may be included in a hardware kit that comes with the product. They self-align when tightened, and allow for a secure connection without requiring drilling or gluing by the consumer.

One common type of knock-down fastener is the cam lock, used in butt joints. After two members are brought together, a cam lock in one member is twisted, locking onto a dowel extending from the second member, and securing the joint.

Specialist tools and jigs are often required for the repeatable installation of knock-down fasteners (but not for assembly of prefabricated flat-pack furniture), so they tend to be limited to those who are making mass-produced items. However, there are applications in which the hobbyist can benefit from the range of fasteners that are available. They are easier and require less skill to install than some of the other more traditional techniques.

Knock-down fasteners are typically used for carcase joinery; furniture designs using them are usually of frameless construction.

Used for:

Wide application in cabinet making depending on type of fastener: particularly in carcase construction (e.g. Carcase sides to top and bottom, fixed shelving/partitions, drawer boxes, counter tops to carcase)

=== Images of specialty screws ===
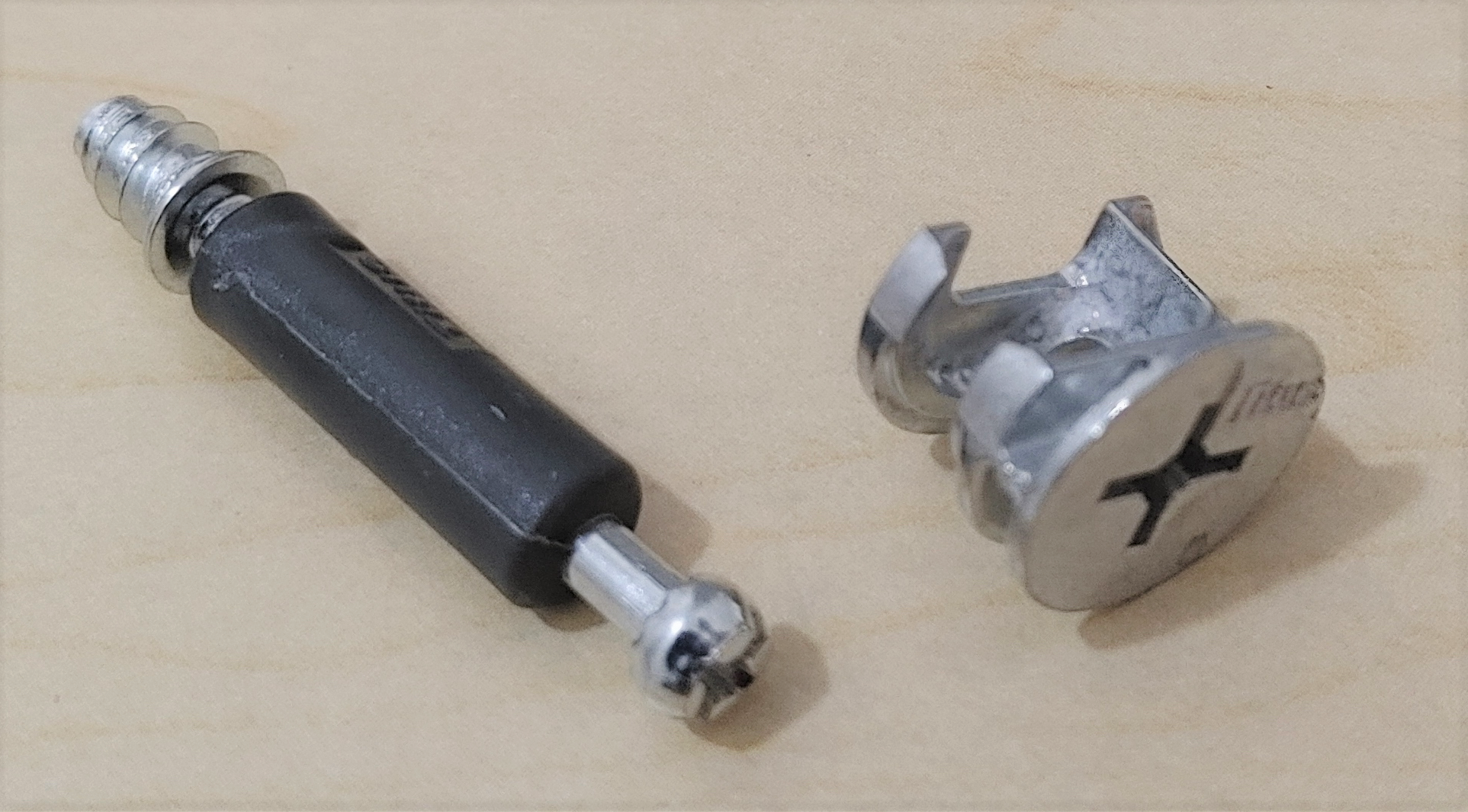
Cam lock screw (right) with special steel dowel pin or screw (left)

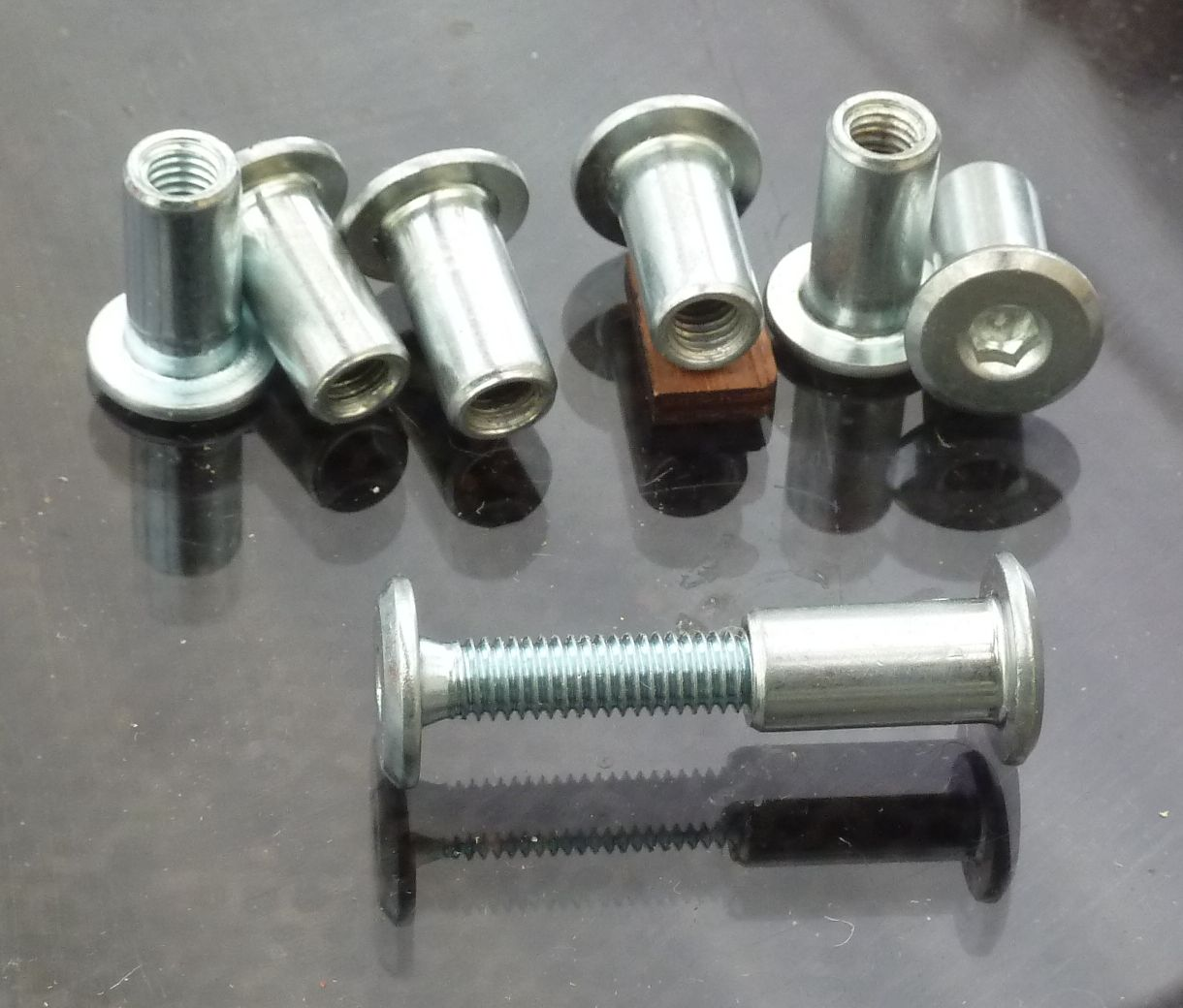
Sex bolts, one with a bolt mounted

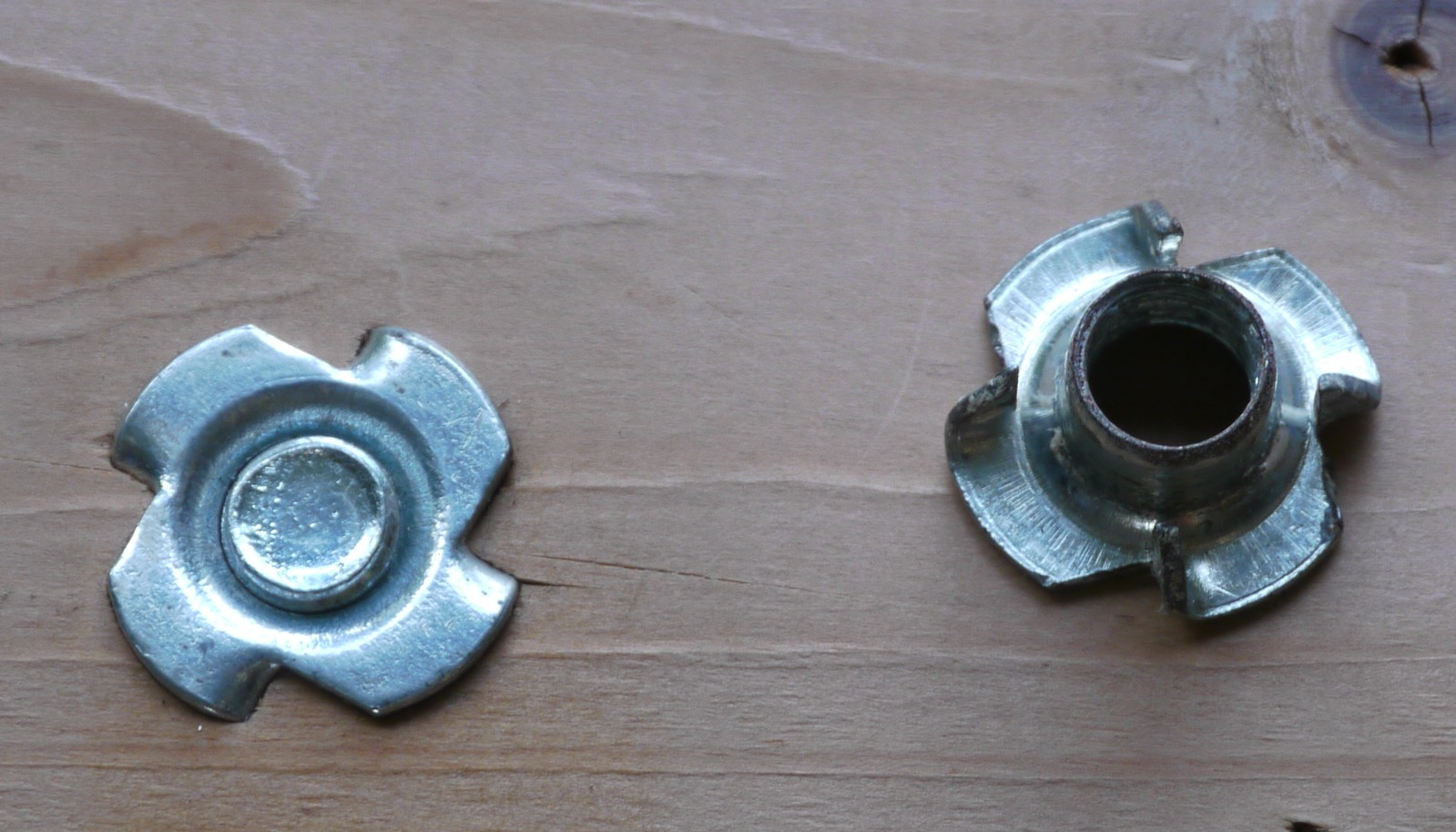
T-nut

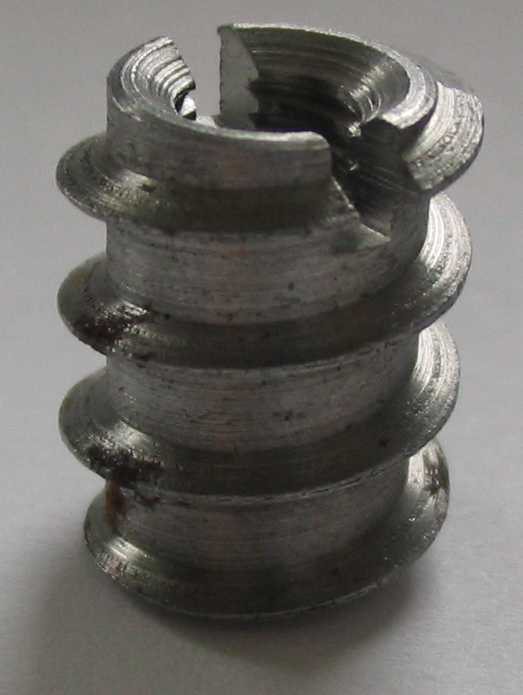
Insert nut for mounting in wood

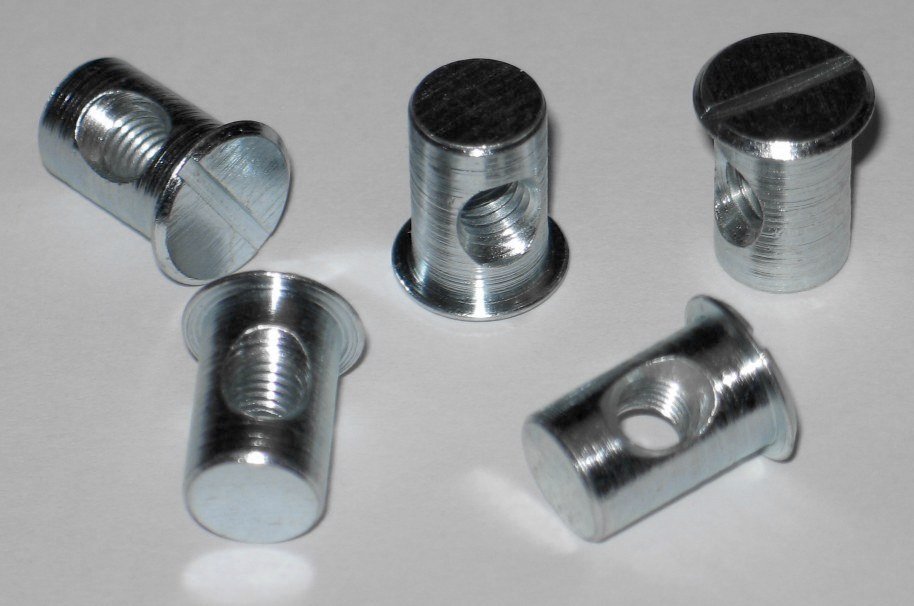
Barrel nuts

Wood hanger screw

== Anchoring furniture to walls ==
To prevent furniture from tipping over, which potentially can result in injury, furniture should be attached to walls. This is particularly important for tall and heavy furniture. Different types of screws can be used for this purpose depending on the wall material and construction. If the wall has a suitable anchoring point (such as a wall stud) this may be suitable as an anchoring point using normal wood screws in a suitable size. On walls of plaster or masonry anchor points may not be available, and it can therefore be necessary to use a drywall anchor or wall plug, respectively.

== See also ==
- Joinery, a part of woodworking involving joining of pieces to produce more complex items
