= Insert =

Insert may refer to:

- Insert (advertising)
- Insert (composites)
- Insert (effects processing)
- Insert (filmmaking)
- Insert key on a computer keyboard, used to switch between insert mode and overtype mode
- Insert (molecular biology)
- Insert (SQL)
- Fireplace insert
- Package insert
- Threaded insert
- Another name for a tipped tool, a cutting tool used in metalworking
- Another name for patch point, a feature on audio mixing consoles
- Inserts, a 1974 film directed by John Byrum

== See also ==
- Insertion (disambiguation)
