= Insert (composites) =

Pins, bolts, screws, joints and other structures used with composite panels

Inserts are pins, bolts, screws, joints and other structures that are used to transfer localized loads to a composite panel or to join two composite panels together. Metallic inserts are commonly used in the aerospace and marine industries to attach objects to sandwich composite panels.

Here is some history as referenced in the forward of ASME B18.29.1. Helical coil screw thread inserts have been in use for many years. It was first invented in the 1930s and found initial acceptance in aircraft manufactured and serviced by the Allied Air Forces during World War II. Since that time, applications for helical coil inserts have come into broad usage in aerospace, automotive and industrial equipment. Usage originally included metric spark plus sizes that were delineated in Europe in the 1950s coming into inch using countries in the 1960s. ASME Subcommittee 29 of the B18 Committee put together the first version of a standard in 1993. In 2010, ANSI approved of recent revisions and ASME published a revision of B18.29.1 — Helical Coil Screw Thread Inserts — Free Running and Screw Locking (Inch Series).

Some kinds of knurled nut are designed as inserts between metal bolts and soft plastic.

T-nuts, insert nuts, and barrel bolts are often used in ready-to-assemble furniture as inserts between metal bolts and wood.
