= Clip-on nut =

Nut designed to be clipped to sheet metal

A clip-on nut, also known as a sheet metal nut or a speed nut (but this is ambiguous, see speed nut), is a type of nut designed to be clipped to sheet metal. It is a type of captive nut commonly made as a cage nut.

== Types ==
They come in many forms based upon: where they clip on, shape, and type of thread. Each clip-on nut is designed for only a small range of sheet metal gauges (thicknesses). They are usually made from spring steel.

=== G-nut ===
A G-nut, or G-style nut, is shaped like a "G" and clips to the edge of a sheet metal object. It is different from all the other types in that it is meant to clip over a small flange on the edge of the sheet metal. The threads are from an integrated nut that has a special boss to sit in a hole in the sheet metal.

=== J-nut ===
A J-nut is a nut that clips to the edge of the sheet metal. It is named after the way it is shaped; the thread is on the long side of the "J". The thread may either be of a speed nut form or have an integrated hex or square nut. Due to the short retaining leg the nut is allowed to float more, which can help with misalignment, but the nut is free to unclip from the sheet metal as well.

=== S-nut ===
An S-nut, or S-style nut, is shaped like an "S". It is designed to clip on the edge of a sheet metal object. The threads are provided by an integrated nut.

=== Square style ===
A square style clip-on nut does not clip onto the edge of the sheet metal, but rather the edges of a square hole or slot. It is a square nut that has a sheet metal retainer that protrudes down two sides of the nut. These legs are formed to have lips that grab onto the sheet metal object. Prior to tightening the nut, it can float in the hole or slot, but when the nut is tightened, it presses the lips of the retainer out and anchors itself in place.

=== U-nut ===
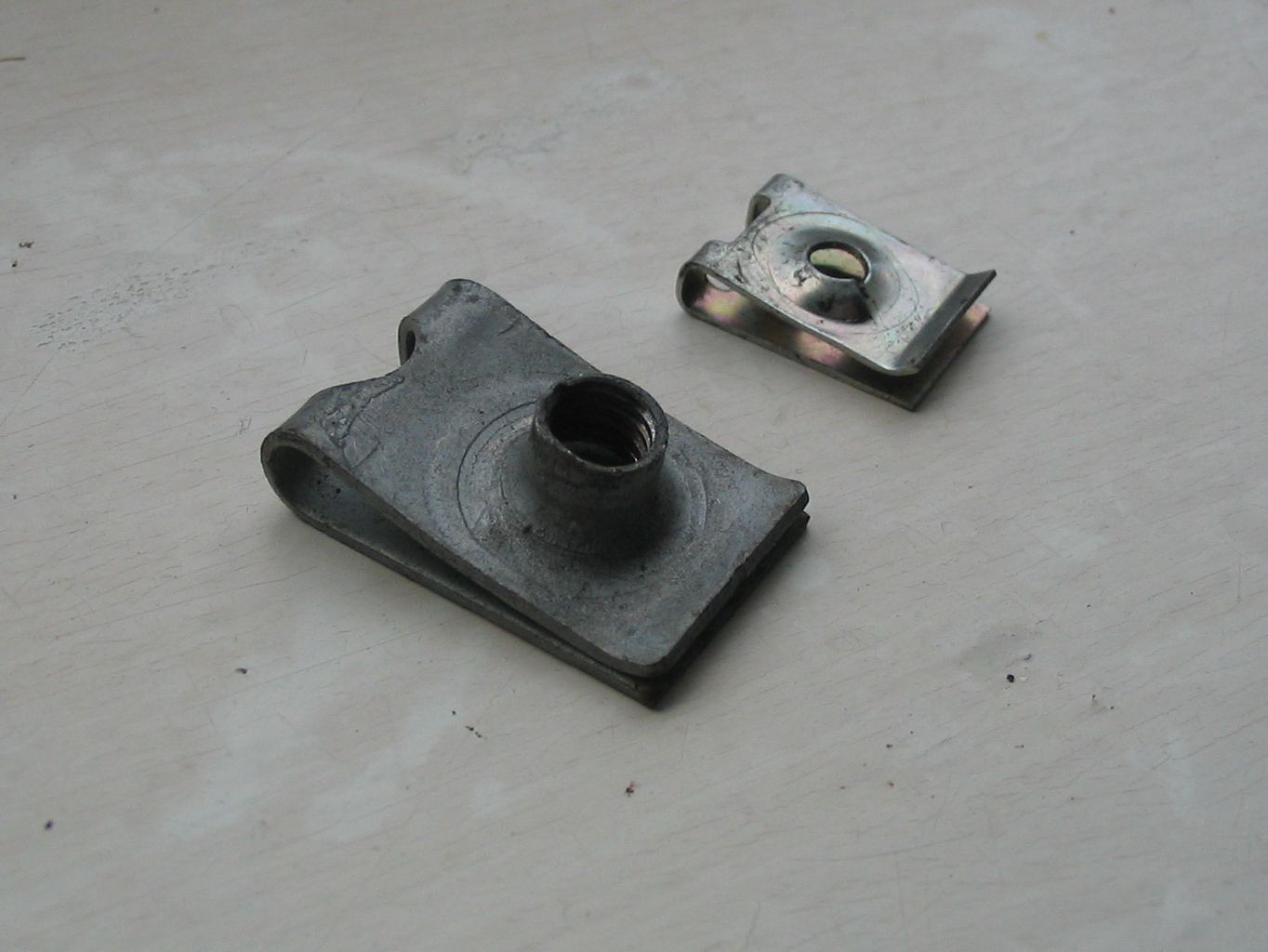
An M6 spire clip or chimney U-nut for a bolt and a #8 u-nut for a self-tapping screw

A U-nut is very similar to a J-nut except that both legs are the same length. Because of this, a retaining clip is usually formed on the leg without the threads. This helps keep the nut in place while not screwed down. The thread may be of a speed nut style, integrated nut, or have an extruded portion that is tapped. There are "standard" and "wide-panel" versions; the standard version has a solid hinge section, whereas the wide-panel version has a longer hinge with the center section cut-away to allow for easier installation.

== See also ==
- Fastener
- Threaded insert
