= Wet wing =

Aircraft integral fuel tank system

A wet wing (also referred to as integral fuel tanks) is an aerospace engineering technique where an aircraft's wing structure is sealed and used as a fuel tank.

The use of wet wings has become common among civilian designs, from large transport aircraft, such as airliners, to small general aviation aircraft. Several military aircraft, such as airlifters and aerial refueling tankers, have incorporated the technique as well. A number of strike aircraft, such as the Grumman A-6 Intruder, have also been furnished with wet wings. While it is technically feasible, studies have found it generally impractical to convert aircraft between wet wing and non-wet wing fuel storage.

== Features and performance ==
The wet wing offers several advantages. By eliminating the need for separate bladders, tanks, or other containers to house the fuel, weight savings are achieved, improving operational efficiency and performance. In comparison with other methods, the wet wing maximises the structural volume available within the wings, while alternative approaches are less space-efficient. There are benefits from a safety point of view, as fuel would be discharged externally in the event of a leak, rather than within a potentially populated section of the aircraft. The thickness of the wing is typically greater than that of an individual bladder or tank, a factor which decreases the likelihood of damage-related leaks, particularly in the event of a crash.

A disadvantage of the wet wing is that every rivet, bolt, nut plate, hose and tube that penetrates the wing must be sealed to prevent fuel from leaking or seeping around these hardware components. This sealant must allow for expansion and contraction due to rapid temperature changes (such as when cold fuel is pumped into a warm wing tank) and must retain its sealing properties when submerged in fuel and when left dry for long periods of time. Because the tanks form an integral part of the structure, they cannot be removed without considerable disassembly of the overall aircraft; several access panels are also necessary to perform maintenance activities and permit inspections.

Beyond the complications in the design and manufacture of the aircraft, a wet wing necessitates ongoing maintenance activities throughout its operating life. Commonly, the sealant will need to be replaced; the removal of old sealant (and the application of fresh) can be considerably difficult when working on a relatively small wing tank. Without appropriate maintenance, wet wings will commonly start leaking after a while, usually due to seal deterioration; however, resealing work may not be immediately successful and requires multiple applications. Improved methods of sealing have been devised, reportedly extending the interval between resealing.

Notable accidents in which the wet wing design and its drawbacks were causative include Chalk's Ocean Airways Flight 101 and the 1961 Goldsboro B-52 crash. Multiple aircraft have also sustained considerable structural damage due to improper wet wing maintenance. Multiple instances of manufacturing-related debris, posing a threat to aircraft safety, have been discovered on both civilian and military aircraft.
