= Nut (hardware) =

Type of fastener with a threaded hole

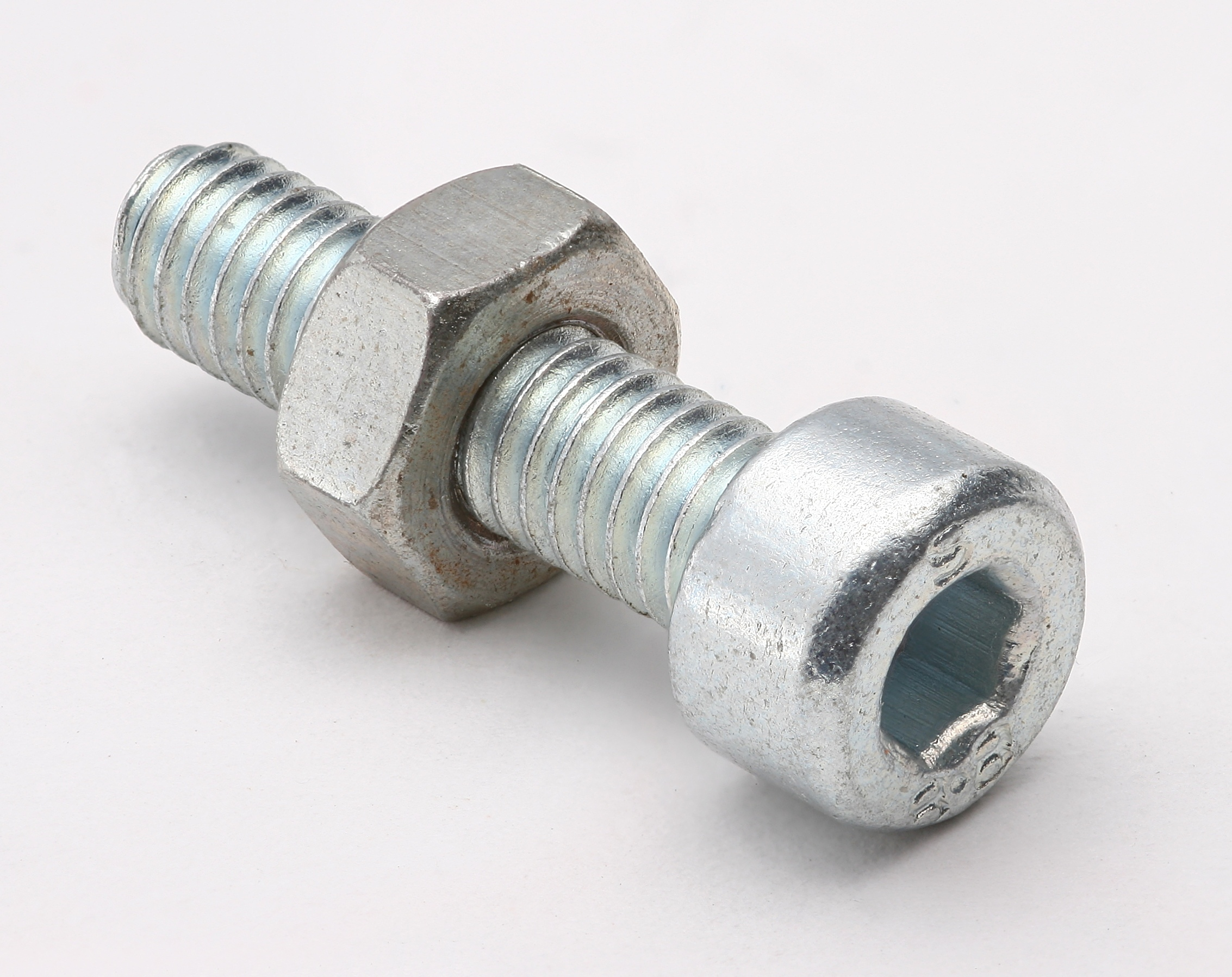
An M4 nut threaded onto an Allen key socket head screw

A nut is a type of fastener with a threaded hole. Nuts are almost always used in conjunction with a mating bolt to fasten multiple parts together. The two partners are kept together by a combination of their threads' friction with slight elastic deformation, a slight stretching of the bolt, and compression of the parts to be held together.

In applications where vibration or rotation may work a nut loose, various locking mechanisms may be employed: lock washers, jam nuts, eccentric double nuts, specialist adhesive thread-locking fluid such as Loctite, safety pins (split pins) or lockwire in conjunction with castellated nuts, nylon inserts (nyloc nut), or slightly oval-shaped threads.

Square nuts, as well as bolt heads, were the first shape made and used to be the most common largely because they were much easier to manufacture, especially by hand. While rare today due to the reasons stated below for the preference of hexagonal nuts, they are occasionally used in some situations when a maximum amount of torque and grip is needed for a given size: the greater length of each side allows a spanner to be applied with a larger surface area and more leverage at the nut.

The most common shape today is hexagonal, for similar reasons as the bolt head: six sides give a good granularity of angles for a tool to approach from (good in tight spots), but more (and smaller) corners would be vulnerable to being rounded off. It takes only one sixth of a rotation to obtain the next side of the hexagon and grip is optimal. However, polygons with more than six sides do not give the requisite grip and polygons with fewer than six sides require greater space to manoeuvre a spanner between engagements, or the use of a ratchet. Other specialized shapes exist for certain needs, such as wingnuts for finger adjustment and captive nuts (e.g. cage nuts) for inaccessible areas.

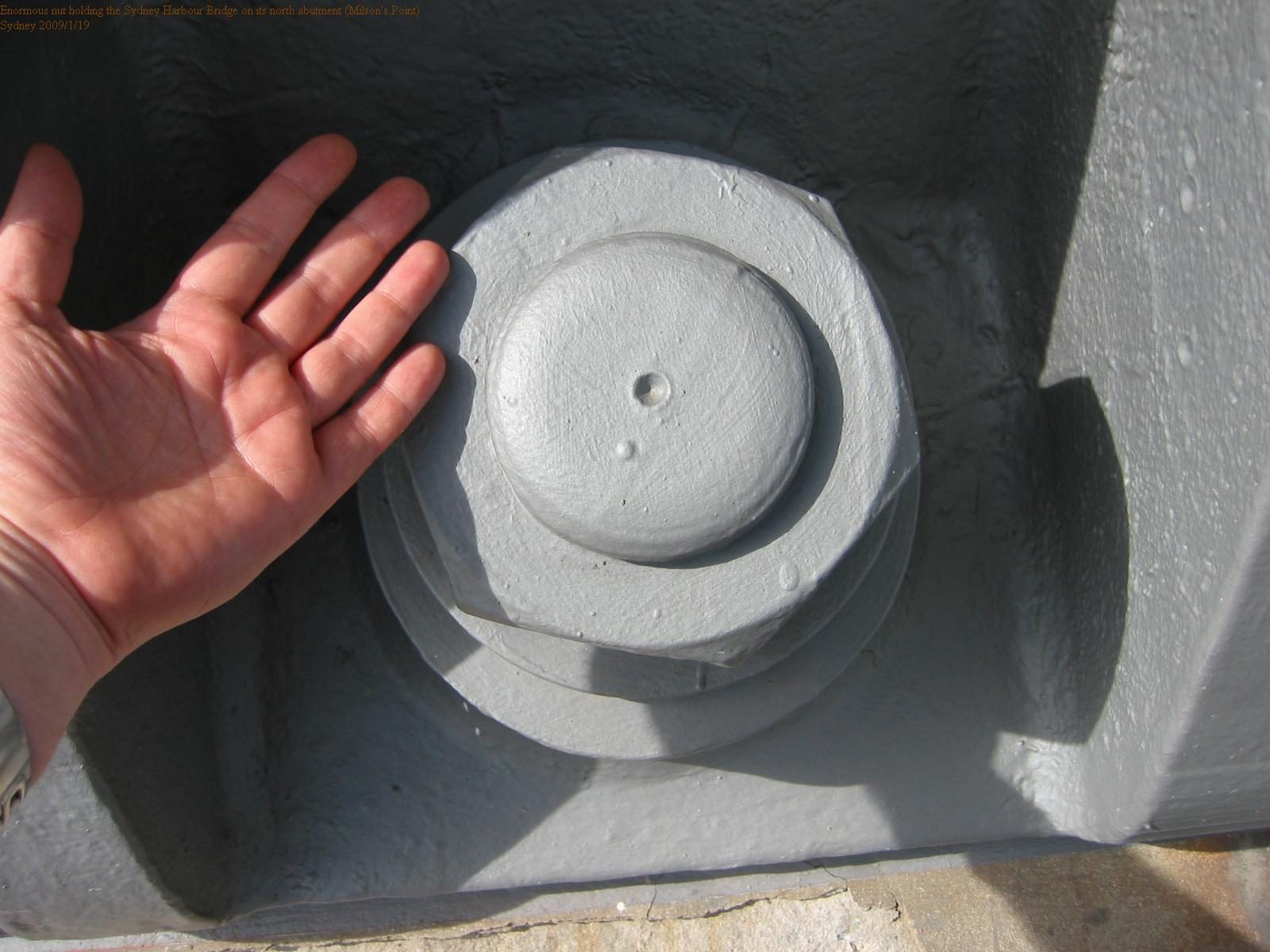
Nuts come in many sizes. This one is part of the Sydney Harbour Bridge.

== History ==
Nuts and bolts were originally hand-crafted together, so that each nut matched its own bolt, but they were not interchangeable. This made it virtually impossible to replace lost or damaged fasteners, as they were all different. Joseph Whitworth in 1841 proposed that a standard should be set, but it did not happen immediately.

In 1851, the Great Exhibition of the Works of Industry of All Nations was to be held in Hyde Park, London, England, and it was decided to build the Crystal Palace as part; this had to be done in 190 days, and at reasonable cost. Research into the remains of the destroyed building in 2024 revealed a major innovation that made this possible. The construction firm responsible, Fox Henderson, decided to use nuts and bolts, but to use standardized sizes, a revolutionary method at the time. This enabled the building to be completed in time. The use of interchangeable nuts and bolts was so successful that the Whitworth standard was widely adopted. A British standard was not formally adopted until 1905.

== Types ==
There is a wide variety of nuts, from household hardware versions to specialized industry-specific designs that are engineered to meet various technical standards. Fasteners used in automotive, engineering, and industrial applications usually need to be tightened to a specific torque setting, using a torque wrench. Nuts are graded with strength ratings compatible with their respective bolts; for example, an ISO property class 10 nut will be able to support the bolt proof strength load of an ISO property class 10.9 bolt without stripping.

Name	Also known as	Image	Description
Acorn nut (cap nut)	Crown hex nut, blind nut, cap nut, domed cap nut, or dome nut		A nut that has a domed end on one side
Barrel nut	Steel cross dowel or dowel nut, cross dowel (woodworking)		A round slug or formed sheet metal part with threads perpendicular to the length of the nut
Cage nut	Caged nut, captive nut, clip nut		A (usually square) nut in a spring steel cage which wraps around the nut. The cage has two wings that when compressed allow the cage to be inserted into the square holes
Clip-on nut	J-nut or U-nut, sheet metal nut, speed nut (ambiguously)		Designed to be clipped to sheet metal
Coupling nut	Extension nut		A threaded fastener for joining two male threads, most commonly a threaded rod,[1][2] but also pipes
Flange nut	Collar nut		Has a wide flange at one end that acts as an integrated washer
HARDLOCK Nut	Eccentric Double Nut	HARDLOCK nut	A self-lock nut. Improvement of the double nut that uses a wedge principal, eliminating space between threads.
Insert nut	Threaded socket	Insert nut	A threaded socket for a wooden workpiece, similar to a wall anchor.
Knurled nut	Thumb nut		Has a knurled outside surface which facilitates tightening by hand (thumb nut) or secures the nut into a handle or cover (insertion nut)
Rivet nut	Rivnut		Can be inserted into a blind hole in a panel and then locked like a rivet with a special tool
Sex bolt	Barrel nut, barrel bolt, binding barrel, Chicago screw, post and screw or connector bolt		Has a barrel-shaped flange and protruding boss that is internally threaded
Shear nut	Break-off nut, breakaway nut		Hex part breaks off as a certain torque is reached
Split nut			Split lengthwise into two pieces (opposed halves) so that its female thread may be opened and closed over the male thread of a bolt or leadscrew
Sleeve nut			
Spring nut			Used with strut to join things to the open face thereof. The grooves in its face engage the lips of the open side of the strut channel, while the spring pushes against the opposite side, to hold the nut in place.
Square nut			Four-sided nut. Compared to standard hex nuts, square nuts have a greater surface in contact with the part being fastened, and therefore provide greater resistance to loosening (though also greater resistance to tightening)
Swage nut	Self-clinching nut		Used on sheet metal. It permanently anchors itself to the sheet metal by swaging the surrounding material.
Star nut	Threadless fork star nut		Part of a threadless-style headset used to attach a bicycle fork to a bicycle frame. Semi-permanently anchors itself inside the fork steerer tube. Can be mounted using a star nut setter.
T-nut	tee nut, blind nut (ambiguously)		Used to fasten a wood, particle or composite materials workpiece, leaving a flush surface.
T-slot nut	T-groove nut		Used with a threaded clamp to position and secure pieces being worked on in a workshop
Wedge nut			Used for creating overhanging decks.
Weld nut			Designed to be welded to another object
Well nut	Rawlnut or Rawl nut (proprietary)		Used to blindly fasten a piece and to seal the bolt hole
Wing nut	Butterfly nut		Has two large metal "wings", one on each side, so it can be easily tightened and loosened by hand without tools

=== Locknuts ===
Many specialized types of nut exist to resist loosening of bolted joints, either by providing a prevailing torque against the male fastener or by gripping against the bolted components. These are generally referred to as locknuts.

- Castellated nut
- Distorted thread locknut
  - Centerlock nut
  - Elliptical offset locknut
  - Toplock nut
- Interfering thread nut
  - Tapered thread nut
- Jam nut
- Jet nut (K-nut)
- Keps nut (K-nut or washer nut) with a star-type lock washer
- Nyloc plate nut
- Polymer insert nut (Nyloc)
- Security locknut
- Serrated face nut
- Serrated flange nut
- Speed nut (Sheet metal nut or Tinnerman nut)
- Split beam nut
- BINX nut

=== Gallery ===
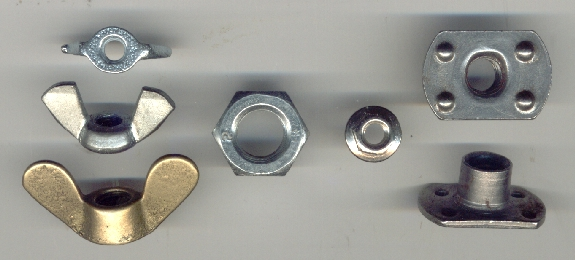
Left to right: Wing, hex, hex flange, and slab weld nuts.

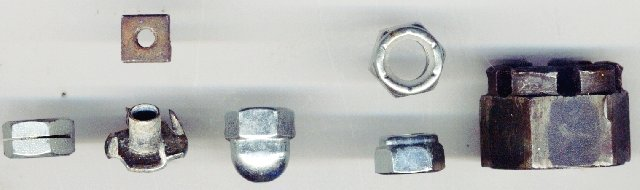
Left to right: Slotted, square (upper), T-nut (lower), cap (or acorn), nylon locking (top and side views), and castellated nuts.

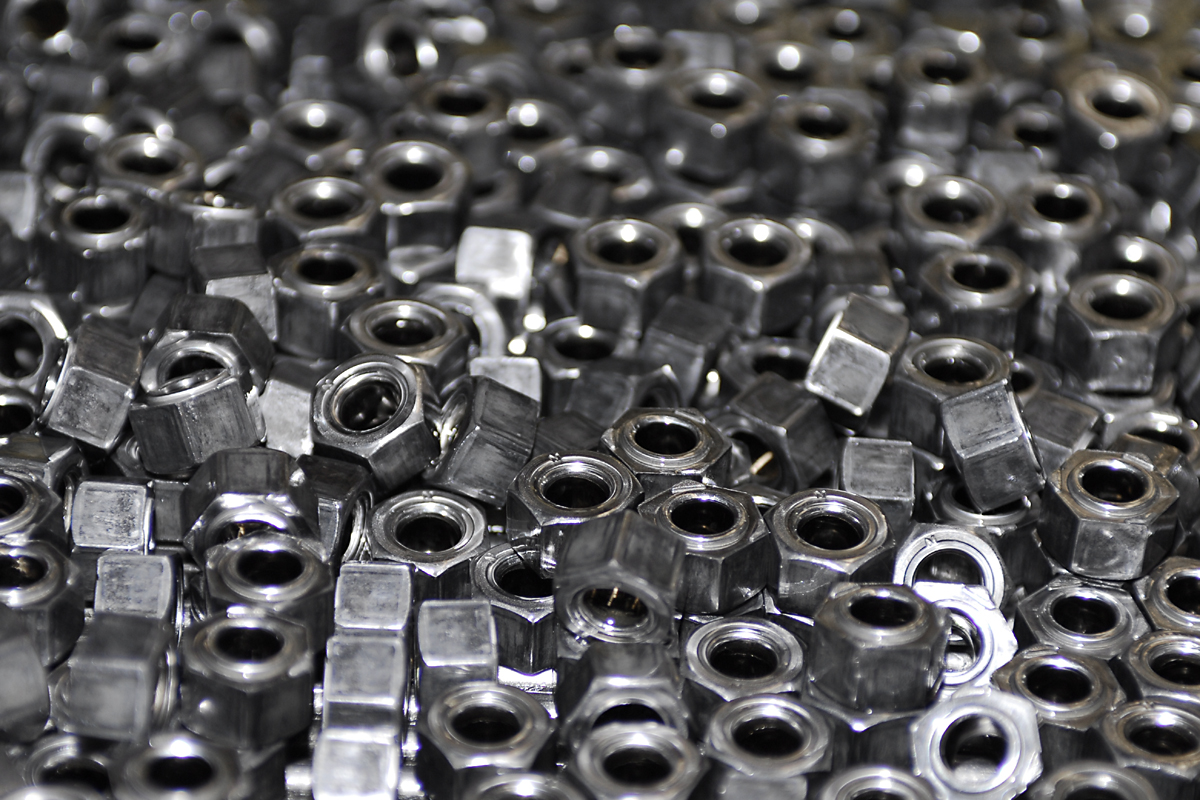
Hexagon nuts.

== Standard nut sizes ==
=== Metric hex nuts ===
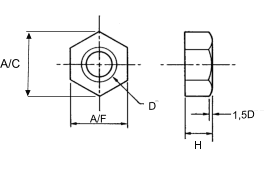
Nut quotation

Note that flat (spanner or wrench) sizes differ between industry standards. For example, wrench sizes of fastener used in Japanese built cars comply with JIS automotive standard.

Nominal hole diameter, D (mm)		Pitch, P (mm)		Across flats, A/F (mm)			External diameter; across corners, A/C (mm)	Height, H (mm)		
1st choice	2nd choice	Coarse	Fine	ISO	DIN	JIS	External diameter; across corners, A/C (mm)	Hex nut	Jam nut	Nylon nut
1		0.25		2.5						
1.2		0.25								
	1.4	0.3								
1.6		0.35		3.2						
	1.8	0.35								
2		0.4		4				1.6	1.2	-
2.5		0.45		5				2	1.6	-
3		0.5		5.5			6.4	2.4	1.8	4
	3.5	0.6		6						
4		0.7		7	7	7	8.1	3.2	2.2	5
5		0.8		8	8	8	9.2	4	2.7	5
6		1	0.75	10	10	10	11.5	5	3.2	6
	7	1			11			5.5	3.5	-
8		1.25	1	13	13	12	15	6.5	4	8
10		1.5	1.25 or 1	16	17	14	19.6	8	5	10
12		1.75	1.5 or 1.25	18	19	17	22.1	10	6	12
	14	2	1.5	21	22	19		11	7	14
16		2	1.5	24	24	22	27.7	13	8	16
	18	2.5	2 or 1.5		27	27		15	9	18.5
20		2.5	2 or 1.5	30	30	30	34.6	16	10	20
	22	2.5	2 or 1.5	32						
24		3	2	36			41.6	19		
	27	3	2	41		41				
30		3.5	2	46			53.1	24		
	33	3.5	2							
36		4	3	55			63.5	29		
	39	4	3							
42		4.5	3							
	45	4.5	3							
48		5	3							
	52	5	4							
56		5.5	4							
	60	5.5	4							
64		6	4							

=== SAE hex nuts ===
UTS size	Nominal hole diameter, D			Pitch, P						Across flats, A/F			Across corners, A/C		Height, H					
UTS size	Nominal hole diameter, D			Coarse (UNC)		Fine (UNF)		Extra fine (UNEF)		Across flats, A/F			Across corners, A/C		Hex nut		Jam nut		Nylon nut	
UTS size	(in)		(mm)	(in)	(mm)	(in)	(mm)	(in)	(mm)	(in)		(mm)	(in)	(mm)	(in)	(mm)	(in)	(mm)	(in)	(mm)
#0										5/32	0.1563	3.969								
#1										5/32	0.1563	3.969								
#2		0.086	2.1844							3/16	0.1875	4.763		5.18		1.65				
#3										3/16	0.1875	4.763		5.10		1.85				
#4		0.1120	2.8448							1/4	0.2500	6.35		7.05		2.25				
#6		0.1380	3.5052							5/16	0.3125	7.938		8.95		2.85				
#8		0.1640	4.1656							11/32	0.3440	8.731	0.386	9.80		3.05				
#10		0.1900	4.8260							3/8	0.3750	9.525	0.461	11.70		3.10				
#12		0.2160	5.4864							7/16	0.4375	11.113								
1/4	1/4	0.250	6.350							7/16	0.4375	11.113								
5/16	5/16	0.3125	7.9375							1/2	0.5000	12.700	0.577							
3/8	3/8	0.375	9.525							9/16	0.5620	14.288	0.650							
7/16	7/16									11/16	0.6750	17.463								
1/2	1/2	0.500	12.70							3/4	0.7500	19.050	0.866							
9/16	9/16									7/8	0.8750	22.225								
5/8	5/8									15/16	0.9375	23.813	1.083							
3/4	3/4	0.750								1 1/8	1.1250	28.575	1.299							
7/8	7/8									1 5/16	1.3125	33.338								
1	1	1	25.40							1 1/2	1.5000	38.100	1.653							

== Classifications ==
Hex nuts, recognized by their six-sided shape, and square nuts, with a square form, are commonly used. Steel nuts are strong and great for construction, while stainless steel ones resist rust, perfect for outdoor use. Brass nuts, corrosion-resistant, find their place in electrical and plumbing work. Lock nuts, like nylon-insert or prevailing torque types, prevent loosening due to vibration or torque, catering to specific needs across industries.

Mechanical specifications of Metric/English sized nuts
Material	Proof strength	Min. tensile yield strength	Min. tensile ultimate strength	Nut marking	Nut class
ISO 898 (Metric)
Low or medium carbon steel	380 MPa (55 ksi)	420 MPa (61 ksi)	520 MPa (75 ksi)		5
Medium carbon steel Q&T	580 MPa (84 ksi)	640 MPa (93 ksi)	800 MPa (116 ksi)		8
Alloy steel Q&T	830 MPa (120 ksi)	940 MPa (136 ksi)	1040 MPa (151 ksi)		10
SAE J995 (English)
Low or medium carbon steel	55 ksi (379 MPa)	57 ksi (393 MPa)	74 ksi (510 MPa)		2
Medium carbon steel Q&T	85 ksi (586 MPa)	92 ksi (634 MPa)	120 ksi (827 MPa)		5
Alloy steel Q&T	120 ksi (827 MPa)	130 ksi (896 MPa)	150 ksi (1034 MPa)		8

== Manufacture ==
The manufacturing process of nuts involves several steps. It begins with the selection of raw materials like steel, stainless steel, or brass, depending on the desired type of nut. The chosen material undergoes cold forming, hot forming, or machining processes to create the basic shape of the nut. Threads are then cut or formed onto the nut using specialized machinery. After threading, nuts may undergo additional treatments such as heat treatment or surface finishing to enhance their strength, durability, or appearance. Some nuts are manufactured according to international standards such as ISO, DIN, or ANSI, to ensure compatibility with bolts worldwide. Quality control checks are performed throughout the manufacturing process to ensure that the nuts meet industry standards and specifications.

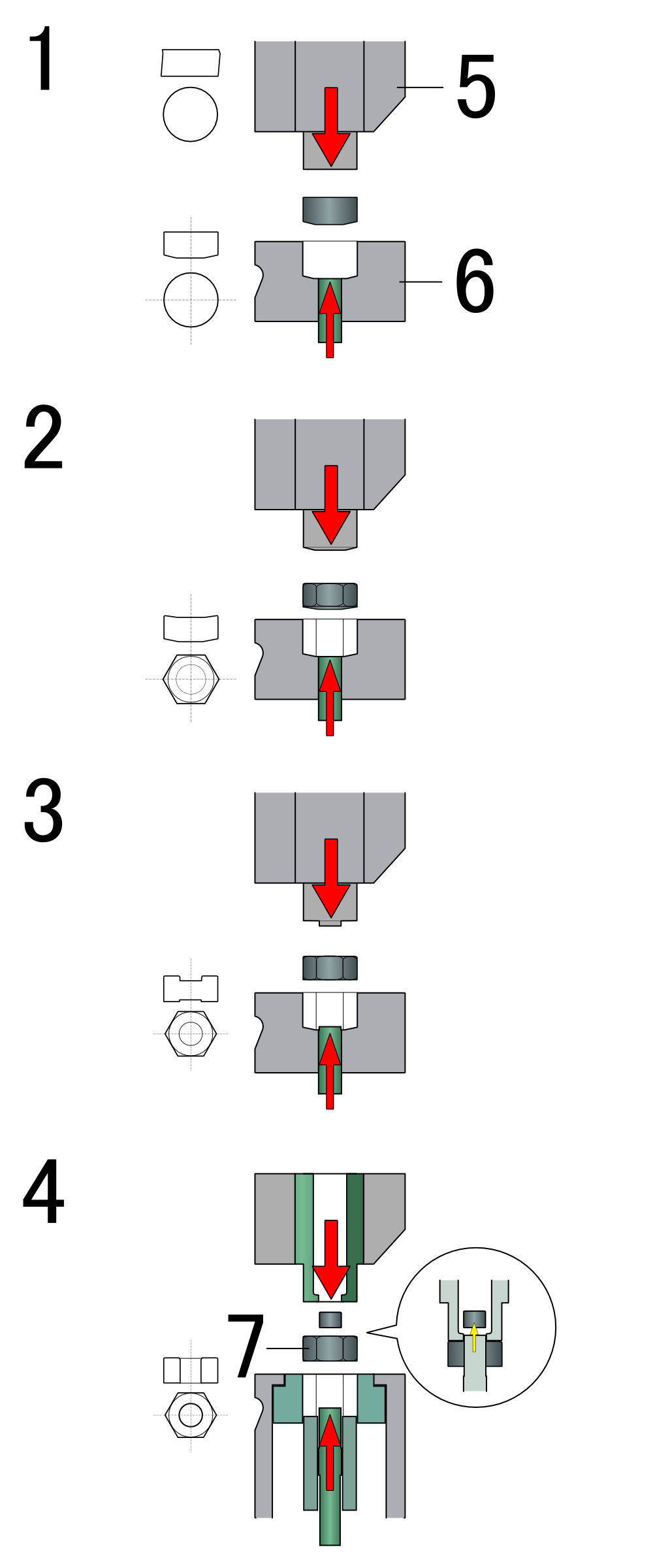
Nut blanking

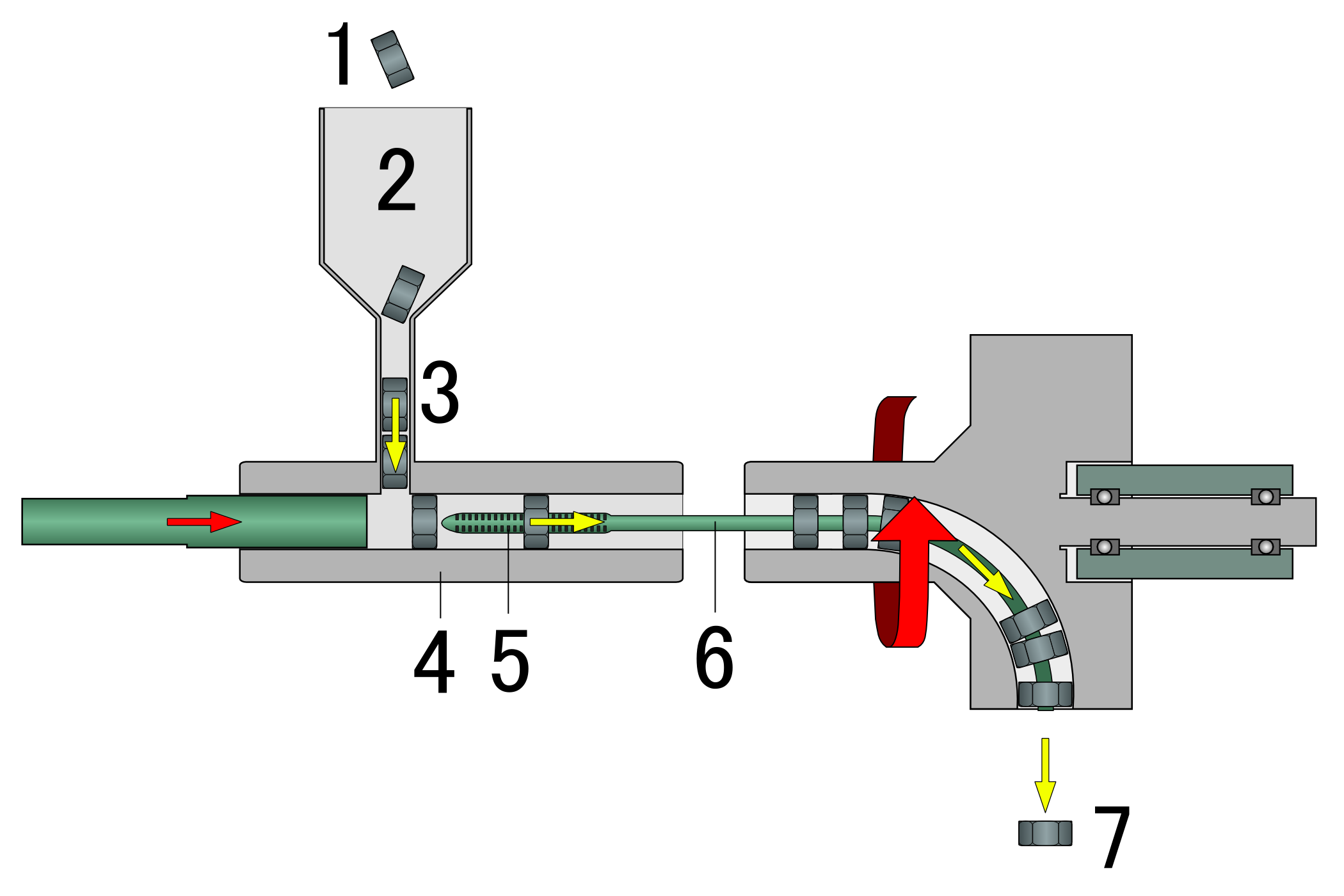
Nut threading

== See also ==
- Bolted joint
- Mechanical joint
- Pipe cap
- Tap
- Tapped hole
- Threaded insert
- Washer
- Width across flats
