= Blind nut =

A blind nut may refer to:

- Rivet nut, a nut designed to be used on sheet metal
- T-nut, a nut designed be used in wood
