= Speed nut =

Type of locknut

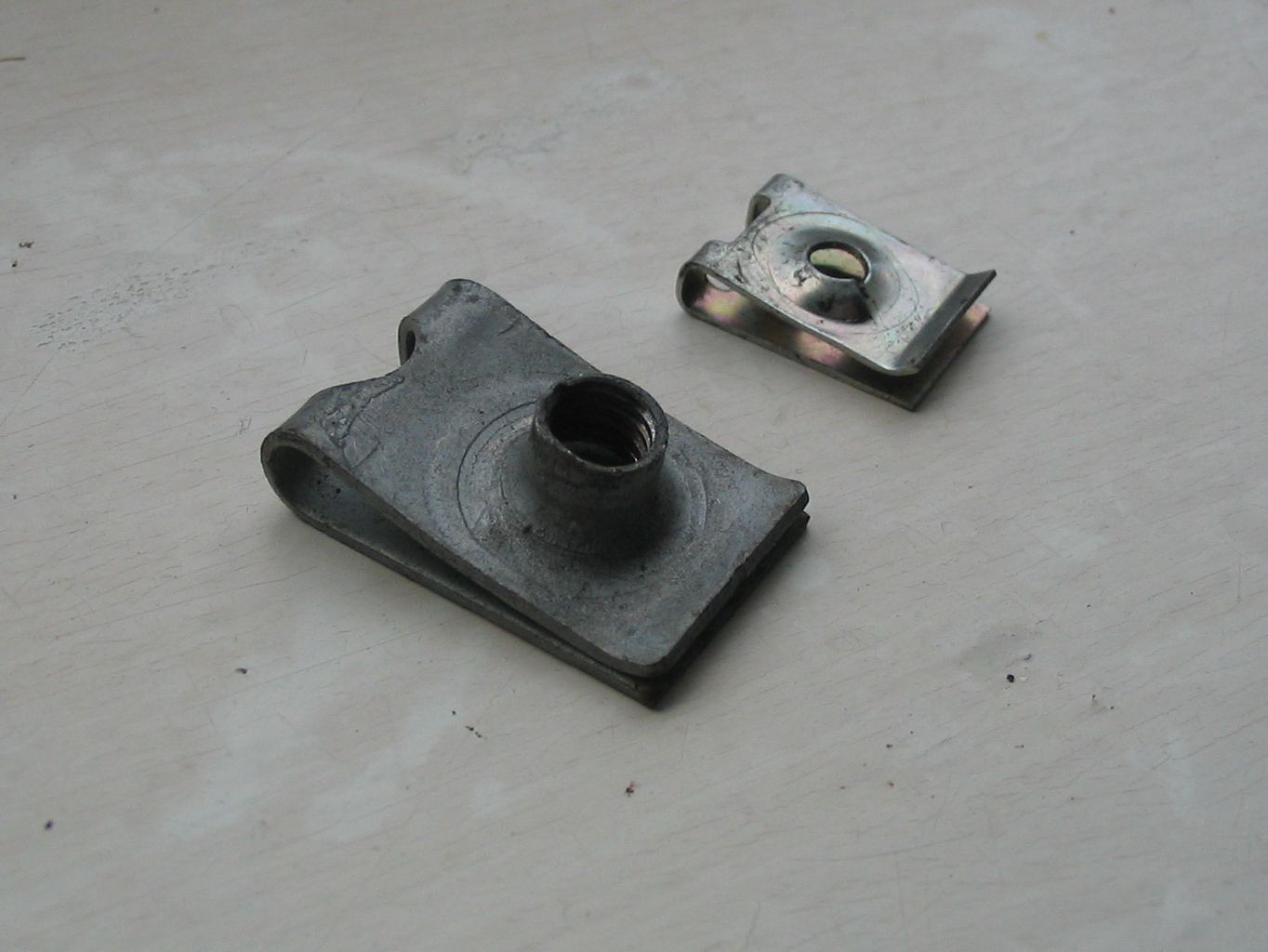
U-nut on the left, speed nut on the right to be used with a self-tapping screw

A speed nut, aka sheet metal nut or Tinnerman nut, is a type of locknut with two sheet metal prongs that act as one thread. They are made from spring steel.

== Description ==
The fastener serves the functions of both a lock washer and a nut. As the fastener is tightened in the nut the prongs are drawn inward until they exert pressure on the root of the thread on the fastener, which locks it from loosening under vibrations.

There are many different types of speed nuts, mostly dependent on the shape of the nut, how it attaches to the workpiece, and what type of screw can be used. Most types are designed for sheet metal screws. Some types, such as the rectangular speed nut, do not attach to the workpiece. These are usually shaped as either a rectangle, a flange nut, or a hex nut; the rectangular speed nut is also known as a flat-style speed nut.

== History ==
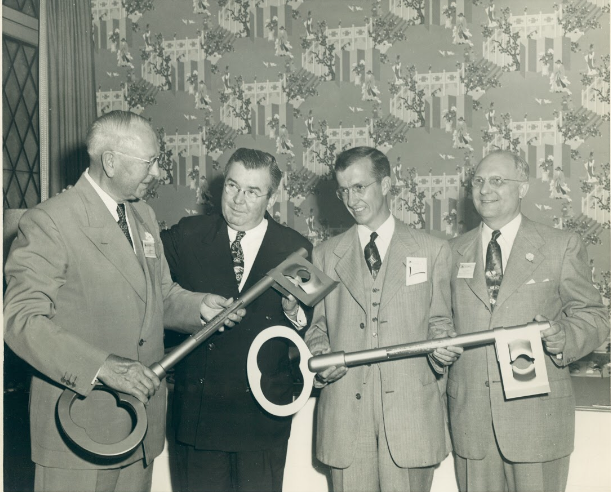
Albert H. Tinnerman left, at the plant opening on Brookpark Road, 1950, presents keys to Mayor Thomas A. Burke right, Cleveland and to Mayor John M. Coyne far right, Brooklyn.

The speed nut was invented in 1923 and patented in 1924 by Albert H. Tinnerman, son of George Tinnerman, who founded Tinnerman Steel Range Company. The company, established in 1870, originally manufactured sheet metal kitchen ranges. However, after Tinnerman invented the nut to resolve issues with stove shipping, the invention became so successful it led the company away from building stoves to building fasteners.

Tinnerman Products was formed in 1939, and evolved from the speed nut development with manufacturing plants in Cleveland, Ohio. A manufacturing plant was constructed on Brookpark Road in the early 1950s. Tinnerman Products later merged with Eaton Yale & Towne in 1969. In 1999, Eaton sold Tinnerman to TransTechnology for $173 million. In 2009, ARaymond purchased Tinnerman for an undisclosed sum.

== See also ==
- Plate nut
