= Insertion =

Insertion may refer to:

- Insertion (anatomy), the point of a tendon or ligament onto the skeleton or other part of the body
- Insertion aria, aria inserted into an opera for which it was not originally composed
- Insertion (genetics), the addition of DNA into a genetic sequence
- Insertion, several meanings in medicine, see ICD-10 Procedure Coding System
- Insertion loss, in electronics
- Insertion reaction, a chemical reaction in which one chemical entity interposes itself into an existing bond of a second chemical entity (e.g.: A + B–C → B–A–C)
- Insertion sort, a simple computer algorithm for sorting arrays
- Local insertion, in broadcasting
- Insertion of a character in a string, one of the single-character edits used to define the Levenshtein distance between two words

== See also ==
- Insert (disambiguation)
