= Acorn nut =

Hardware nut

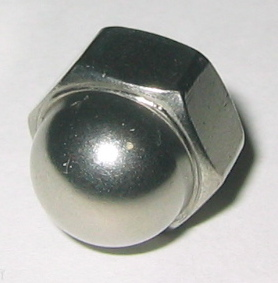
An acorn nut

An acorn nut, also referred to as crown hex nut, blind nut, cap nut, domed cap nut, or dome nut (UK), is a nut that has a domed end on one side. When used together with a threaded fastener with an external male thread, the domed end encloses the external thread, either to protect the thread or to protect nearby objects from contact with the thread. In addition, the dome gives a more finished appearance.

Acorn nuts are usually made of brass, steel, stainless steel (low carbon content) or nylon. They can also be chrome plated and given a mirror finish.

There are two types of acorn nuts. One is low, or the standard acorn nut. The other is the high acorn nut. The high acorn nut is wider and higher and will protect extra long studs. There are also self-locking acorn nuts that have distorted threads in the hex area to create a tight friction fit to prevent the nut from vibrating loose.

There are standards governing the manufacture of acorn nuts. One is Society of Automotive Engineers (SAE) Standard J483, High and Low Crown (Blind, Acorn) Hex Nuts. Another is Deutsches Institut für Normung (DIN) 1587, Hexagon Domed Cap Nuts.
