= Weld nut =

Special type of nut specifically designed to be welded to another object

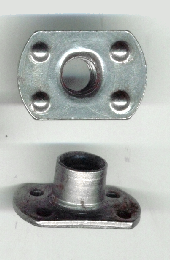
Slab Based Weld Nuts

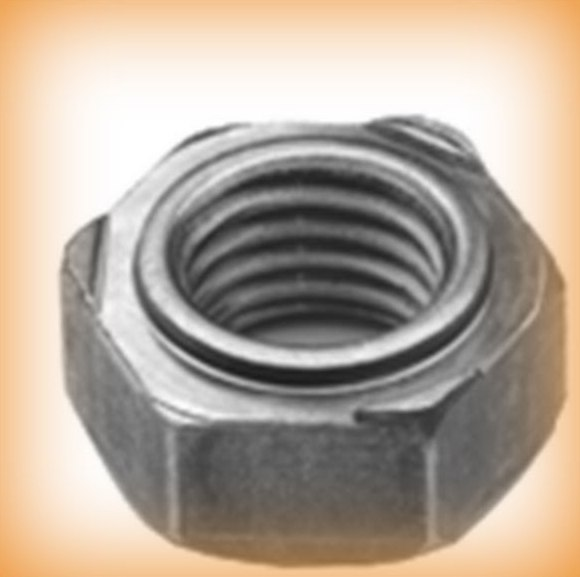
DIN 929 Weld Nut

A weld nut is a special type of nut specifically designed to be welded to another object (spot welding). There are various types for different applications.

== Types ==
Round base nuts

These nuts have a long threaded cylinder with a large circular base to make welding easy. They also sometimes have projections (known as weld nibs or bosses) to keep the nut from warping while welding with a high current.

Slab base nuts

These are very similar to the round base nuts, but with an obround, or slab shaped, base. These are used in channels, tubes, or other tight quarters.

Tab base nuts

Tab base nuts are designed for spot welding on flat workpieces. They have a locating boss around the threads to locate it in a pilot hole.

Hex & square nuts

These nuts are very similar to standard square or hex nuts, but have a locating boss and welding projections. The bosses also keep weld spatter out of the threads.

Retainer weld nuts

Retainer weld nuts, also known as bridge weld nuts, have a floating nut retained inside a retainer to compensate for inconsistencies. The retainer is welded to the work piece while the nut is allowed to float.

Tube end nuts

Tube end nuts are sized to fit into the end of standard sized tubing, thus creating a threaded tube from standard stock.

Twin Piloted Nuts

Dual hole or twin piloted nuts are designed for use where there is a need for tapped holes close together.

Four Projection Weld Nuts

Four projections designed to fuse simultaneously so each projection flows and seats properly.

Single Tab Weld Nuts

Single Projection Weld Nut

Single button projection weld nut for use on heavier gage materials.

Four Projection Weld Nut

== Material ==
The vast majority of weld nuts are manufactured in low carbon steel or stainless steel. This is due to the methods currently available to spot weld or projection weld the hardware to joining material. Aftermarket products such as zinc plating are sometimes used to coat low carbon weld nuts giving it the rust resistant properties of stainless steel at a substantial cost saving.
