= Keps nut =

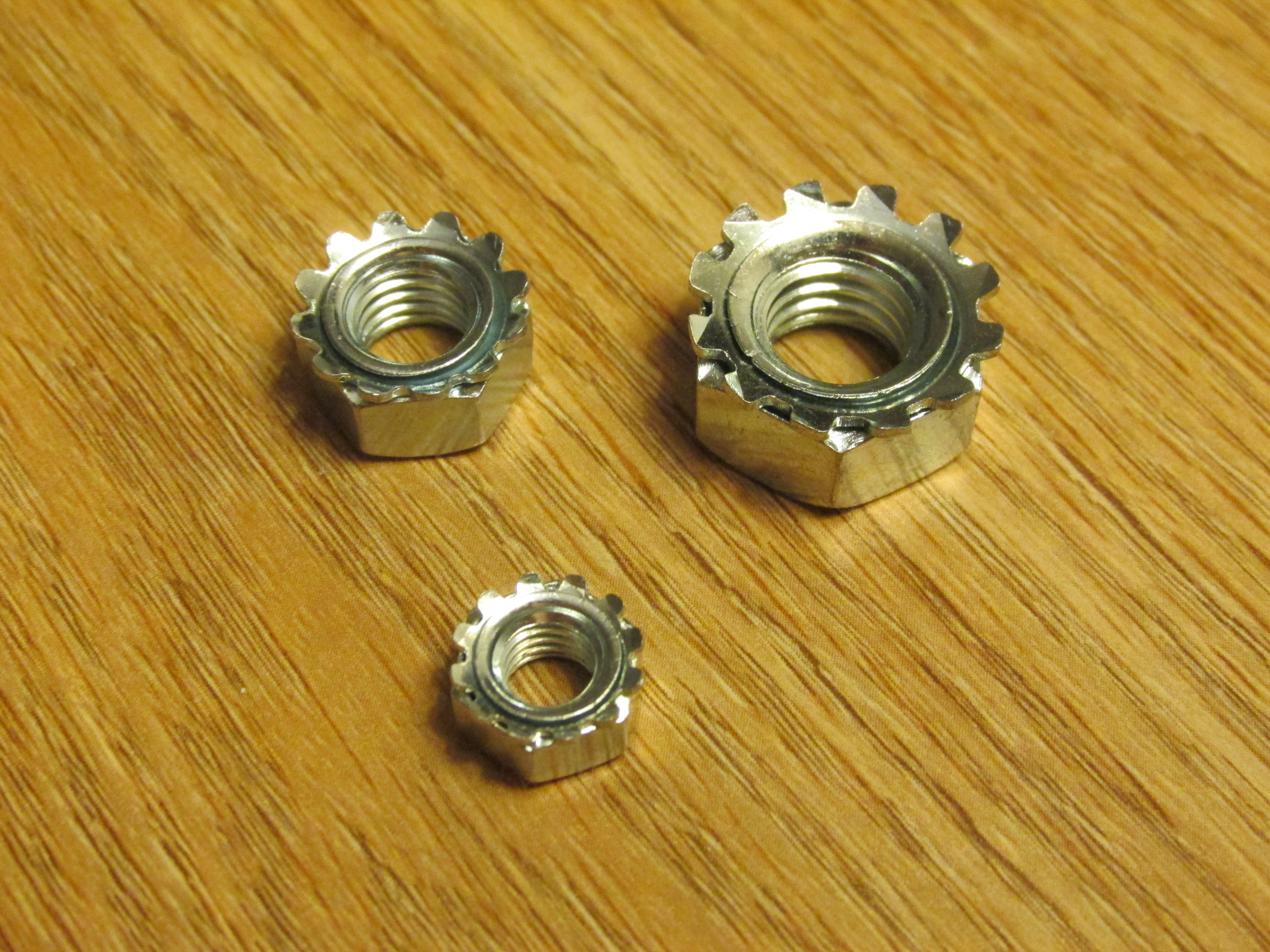
Keps nuts

A Keps nut, (also called a k-lock nut or washer nut), is a nut with an attached, free-spinning washer.

It is used to make assembly more convenient. Common washer types are star-type lock washers, conical, and flat washers.

== 'Keps' trademark ==
Keps is a trademark of ITW Shakeproof. The name comes from "kep" in Shakeproof, and the "s" is because usually more than one are purchased.
