= Width across flats =

Jaw size needed for specific nuts or bolts

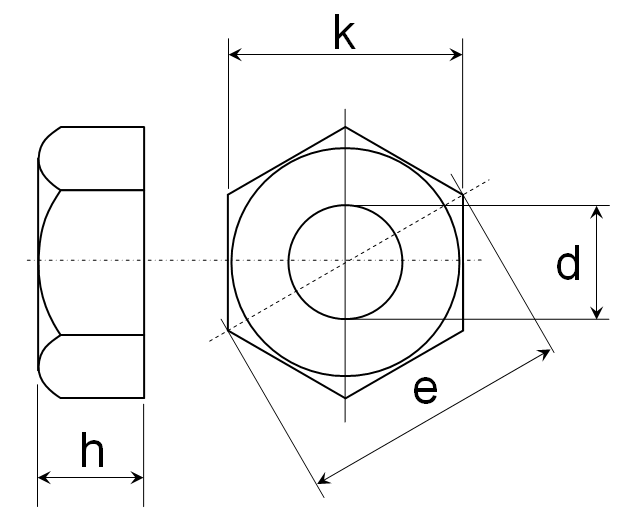
Fastener terminology of hex nuts: d: Nominal thread diameter k: Wrench size (width across flats) h: Thickness e: Width across corners $e = \frac{2\sqrt3}{3} \cdot k \approx 1.154701 \cdot k$

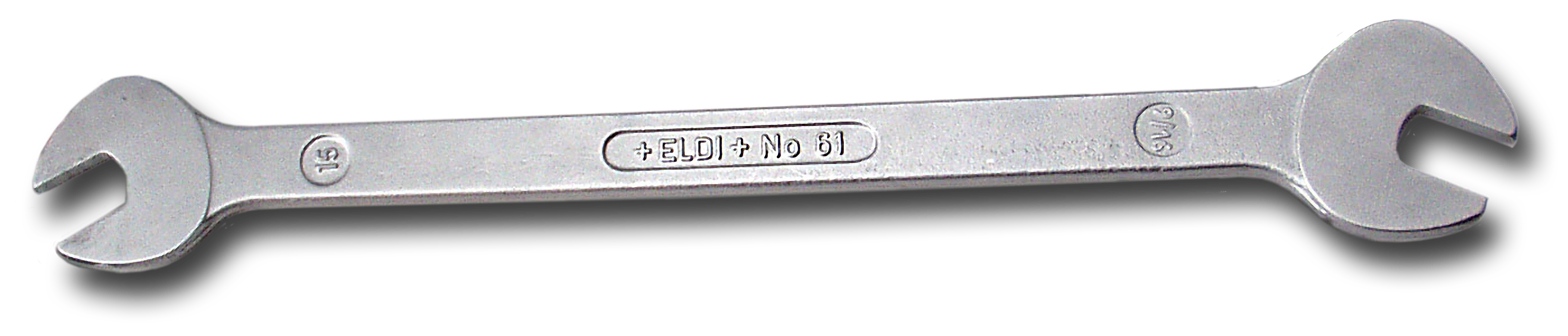

Width across flats is the distance between two parallel surfaces on the head of a screw, bolt, or nut. The width across flats will define the size of the spanner or wrench needed.

== Spanner size ==
The width across flats indicates the nominal "size" of the spanner. The size is imprinted on the spanners in millimeter values or inch sizes with intermediate sizes in fractions (older British and current US spanners).

The two systems are in general not compatible, which can result in rounding of nuts and bolts (i.e. using a 13 mm (0.51 in) spanner in place of a 1/2 inch (12.70 mm)). A few sizes are close enough to interchange for most purposes, such as 19 mm (close to 3/4 inch (19.05 mm)), 8 mm (close to 5/16 inch (7.94 mm)) and 4 mm (close to 5/32 inch (3.97 mm)).

In reality, a wrench with a width across the flats of exactly 15 mm would fit too tightly to use on a bolt with a width across the flats of 15 mm. The tolerances necessary to make the tools usable are listed in documents such as ASME/ANSI B18.2.2 for U.S. standards. For instance, a bolt for a 1-inch nominal diameter thread might have flats that are 1.5 inches apart. The wrench for this bolt should have flats that are between 1.508 and 1.520 inches apart to allow for a little extra space.

== Width across flats ==
The width across flats of the fastener (for example screws, nuts, clamps) is nominally the same as that on the tool. The table below shows dimensions of metric spanners for selected sizes of metric threads. Note that with ISO 272 1982 the width across flats for M10, M12, M14 and M22 were changed from 17, 19, 22 and 32 mm respectively to the current standard.

Nominal thread diameter (mm)	M2	M4	M5	M6	M8	M10	M12	M16	M20	M24	M30	M36	M42
Width across flats (mm)	4	7	8	10	13	16	18	24	30	36	46	55	65

== Widths for bicycles ==
In addition to general industry standards, there are special thread standards, such as bicycle threads according to DIN 79012.

== See also ==
- ISO metric screw thread
