= Square nut =

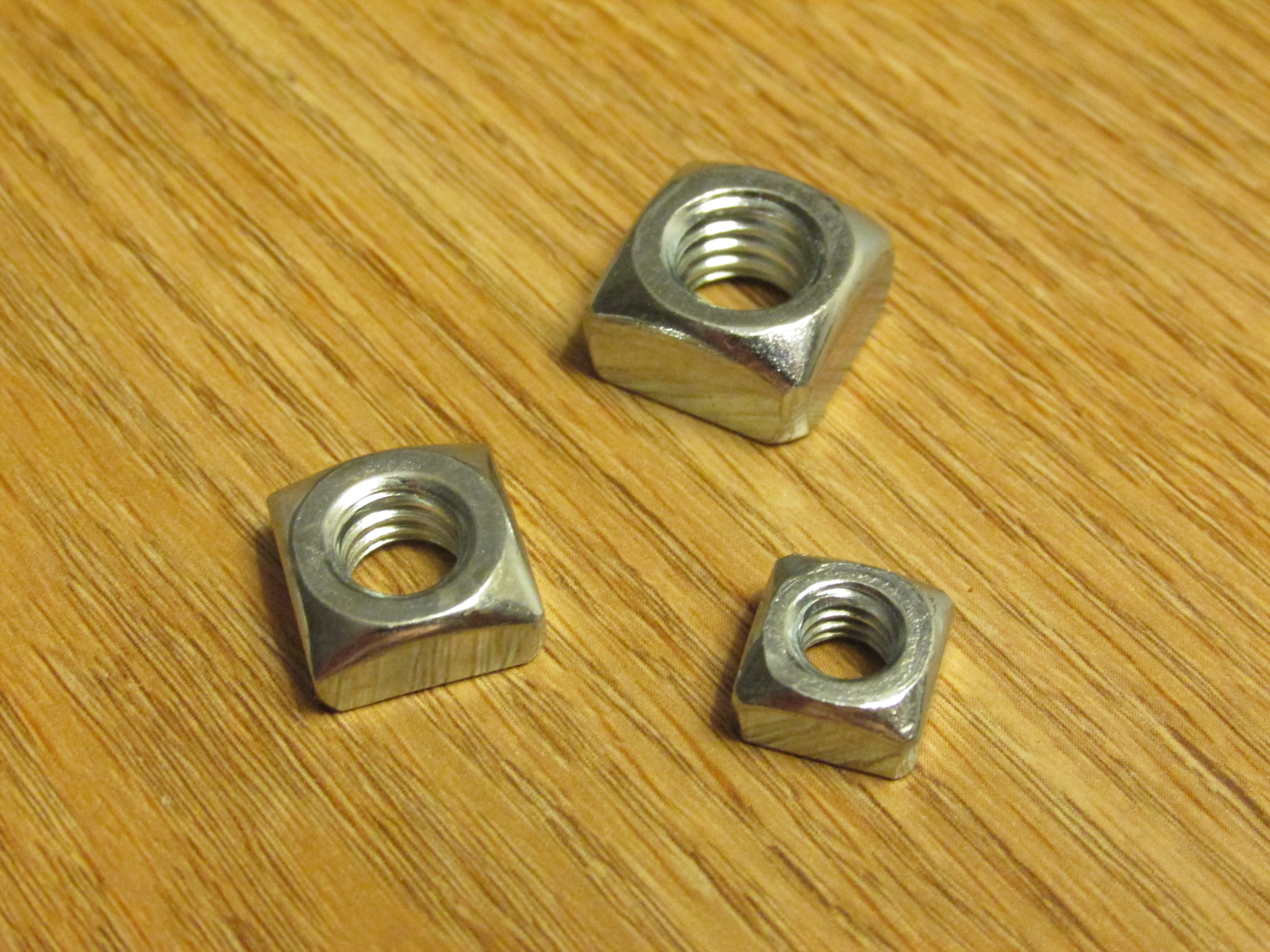
Square nuts

A square nut is a four-sided nut. Compared to standard hexagonal nuts, square nuts have a greater surface area in contact with the part being fastened, and therefore provide greater resistance to loosening (though also greater resistance to tightening). They are also much less likely to become rounded-off after repeated loosening/tightening cycles. Square nuts are typically mated with square-headed bolts. Square nuts are used along with flat washers to avoid damage from its sharp edges and increase the strength of the fastener. Square nuts can have standard, fine or coarse threading with platings of zinc yellow, plain, zinc clear, tin and cadmium, among others. Most can meet either the ASTM A194, ASTM A563, or ASTM F594 standard.

== Benefits ==
Benefits claimed for square nuts include that they

- Can be tightened easily by gripping two sides
- Work well in tight spaces, such as inside electronic devices, by using needle nosed pliers
- Can be more easily tightened using pliers or a wrench in locations where they are not visible to the user
- Can be a quick visual indicator of the tightness of the nut

== Application ==
Commonly used in furniture as a blind nut, they are also used in rail channels to prevent turning of rail when pressure is applied. They are also used as a perfect foundation in metal channels for hidden fasteners.
