= Security locknut =

Industrial fastener composed of two steel threaded parts

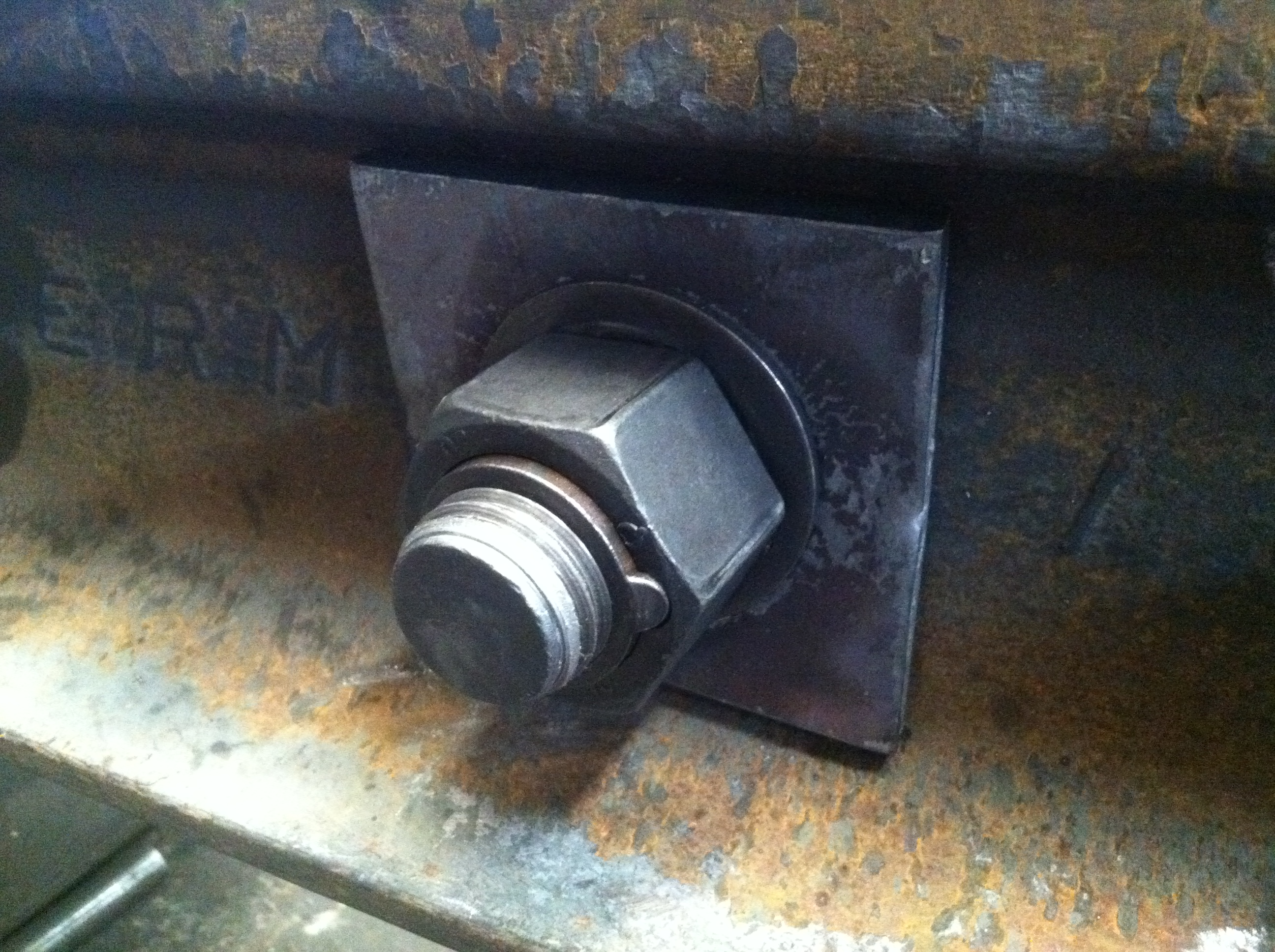
A hexagonal security locknut threaded onto a railroad track bolt.

A security locknut is a type of industrial fastener composed of two steel threaded parts: a nut body and an elliptical spring steel lock ring. Security locknuts are fastened onto a mating bolt to form a bolted joint. Forces of friction (with elastic deformation), a stretching of the bolt, and compression hold the bolted joint firmly together. The lock ring, once assembled into a counterbore in the nut body, provides clamping force on the bolt while the nut body takes the load. This isolates the loading and locking functions and helps prevent the nut from backing off the bolt. Due to the durable spring steel alloy, the security locknut is fully reusable while maintaining prevailing torque in each application.

Security locknuts are found in a variety of industrial applications. They are most commonly used in high vibration environments where non-locking nuts could come loose. In the rail industry, security locknuts can be found most commonly on railroad fishplates, frogs, switches, and crosses. Mining equipment features security locknuts on conveyor systems, crushers, shakers, mining chains, among other applications. In addition, mills use security locknuts to hold mill liners in place. Heavy vibration equipment manufacturers use security lockouts on woodchippers, grinders, pulverizers, shakers, feeders, and more.

The sole manufacturer of the security locknut is Security Locknut LLC, located in Vernon Hills, Illinois, United States.

Varieties of security locknuts
Shapes	Hex, square
Sizes	Imperial (3/8" to 4"), Metric (M10 to M64)
Body styles	Heavy hex, heavy hex thin thin, finished hex
Thread	Coarse, fine, custom
Grades	Grade 5, Grade 8
Finish options	Zinc dichromate, plain

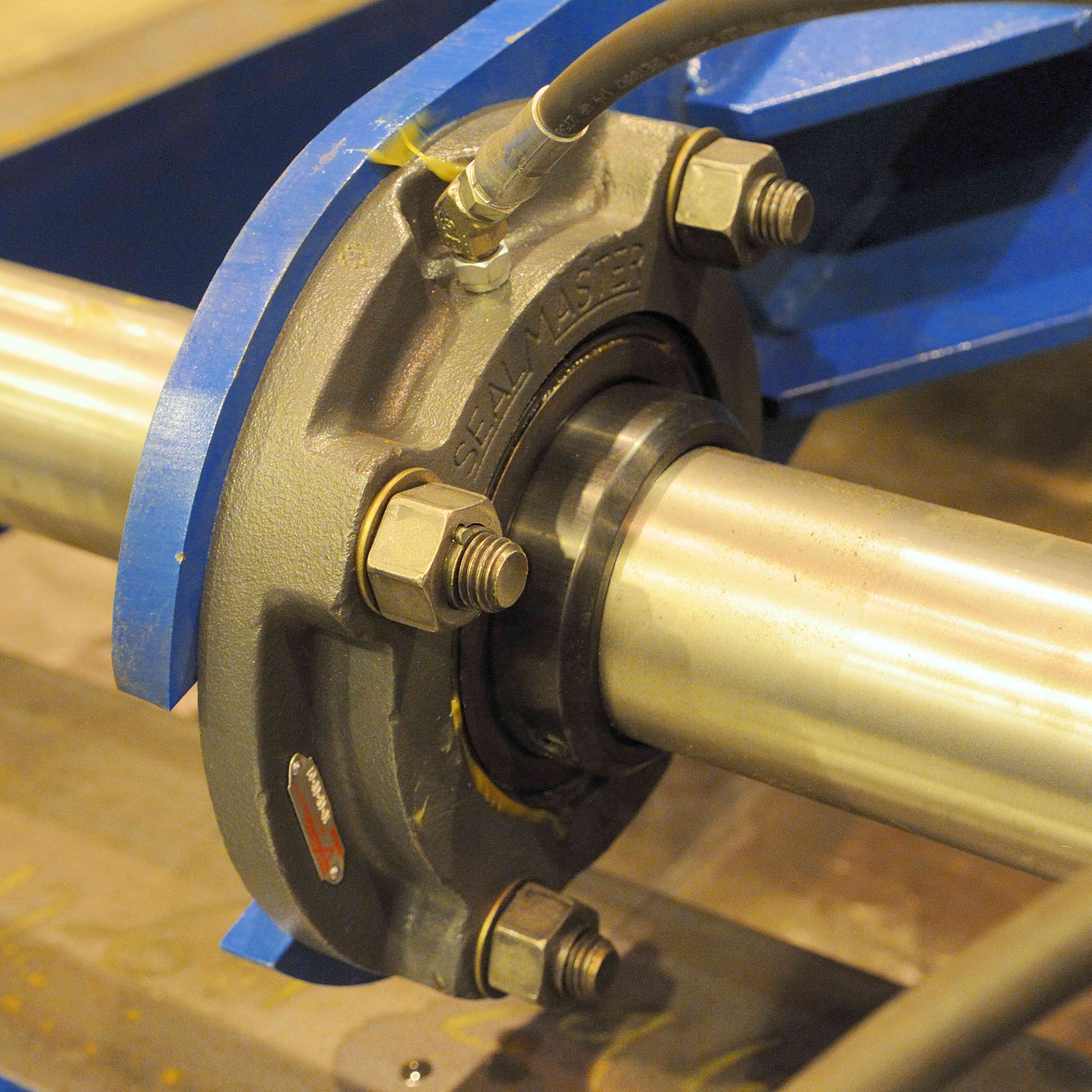
Several security locknuts being used on bolted joints on vibratory equipment.
