= Barrel nut =

Type of fastener

On some firearms the gun barrel is fastened to the receiver with a nut, referred to as a barrel nut.

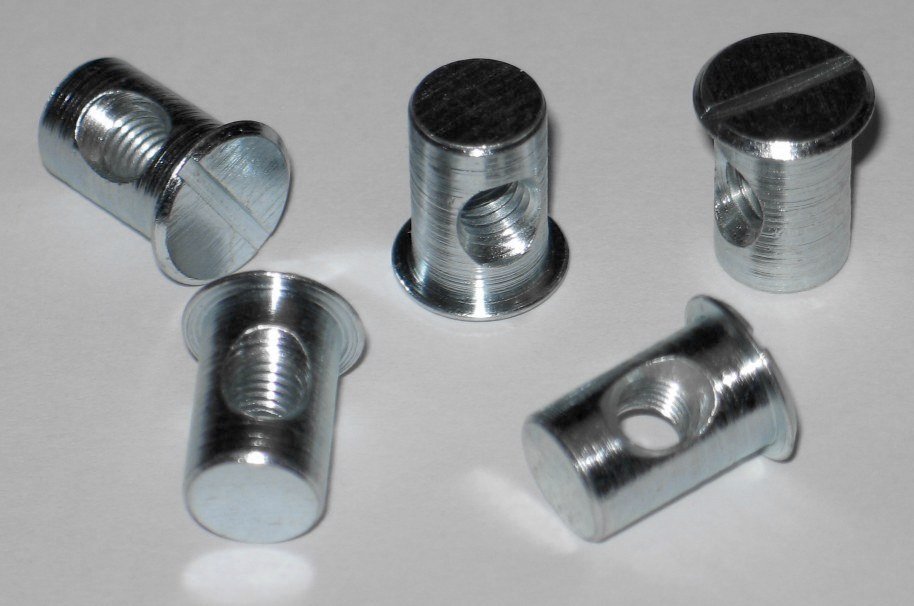
Barrel nut with M6 thread

A barrel nut (also known as steel cross dowel or dowel nut) is a specialized forged nut, and is commonly used in aerospace and ready-to-assemble furniture applications.

It is used to bolt thin sheet metal parts to larger, often billet or forged, parts. The barrel nut is a round slug, or formed sheet metal part with threads perpendicular to the length of the nut. The nut sits in a hole inside the forging and a standard bolt is threaded into the barrel nut from outside the sheet metal. They are preferred over a standard nut and bolt, because they do not require a flange to be machined or forged onto the receiving part, thus reducing weight.

Furniture cross dowel barrel nuts are cylindrical shaped metal nuts (metal dowels) used with furniture connector bolts to join two pieces of wood. The inside threaded hole is unusual in that it passes through the sides of the dowel. To install, the pieces of wood to be joined are aligned, then a bolt hole is drilled through one piece of wood and into the other. A dowel hole is drilled laterally across the bolt hole and the cross dowel is inserted into it. The end of the cross dowel is slotted so that a screwdriver can be inserted to rotate the dowel so that its threaded shaft aligns with the bolt hole. The furniture connector bolt is then inserted into the bolt hole and screwed into the cross dowel until the wood pieces are held tightly together.

Barrel nuts are also common in flat-pack furniture, where long bolts and barrel nuts are used to hold together T joints in chipboard sheets.

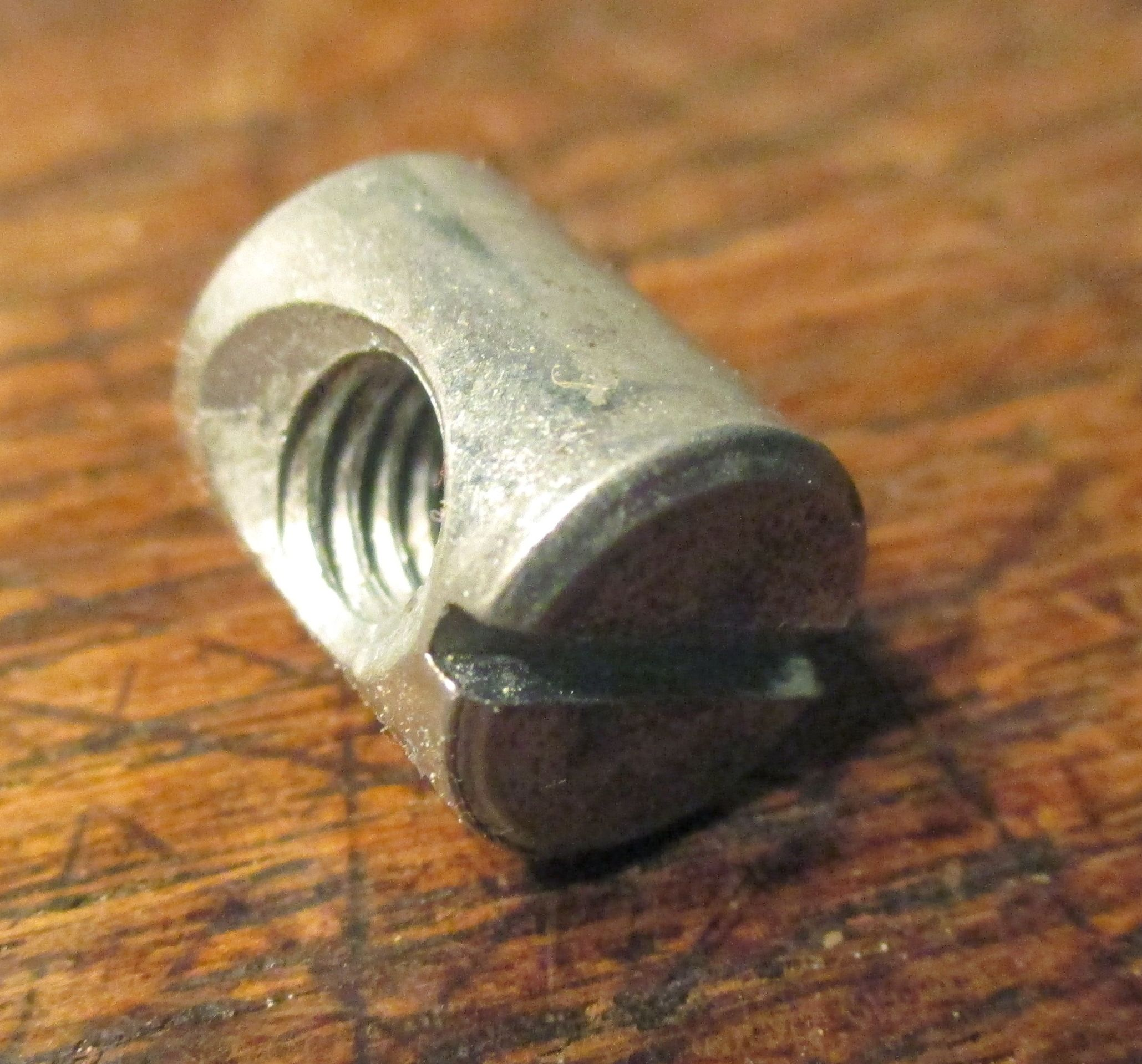
A 10 mm long barrel nut with M6 threads

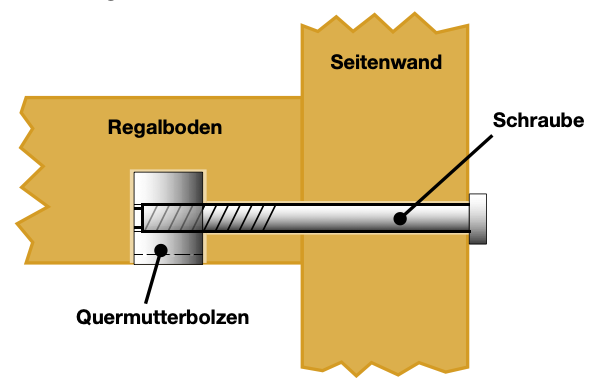
Sketch of use in furniture

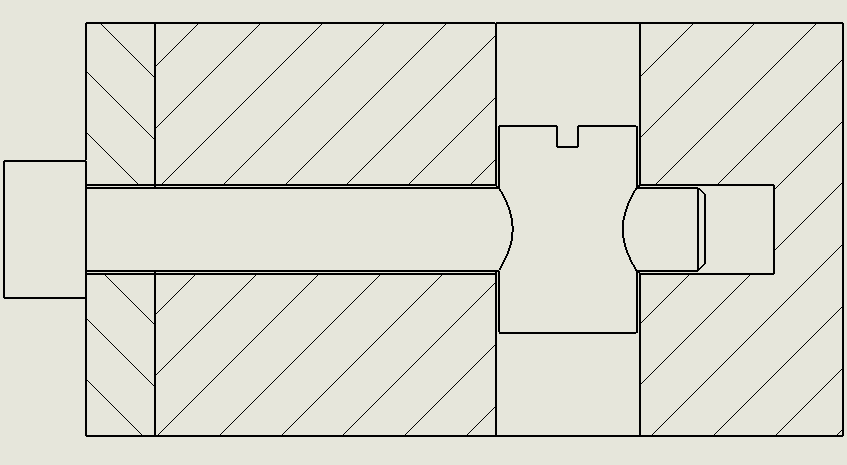
A cutaway drawing of a cross dowel in use

Sketch of use in wood construction
