= T-slot nut =

A T-slot nut is used with a threaded clamp to position and secure pieces being worked on in a workshop. The T-slot nut slides along a T-slot track, which is set in workbench or table for a router, drill press, or bandsaw. T-slot nuts are also used with T-slot structural framing to build a variety of industrial structures and machines.

A T-slot bolt is generally stronger than a T-slot nut and hex-head cap screw.

A heavy-duty T-slot nut with a M12 bolt is rated to support 10000 N (about 1 imperial ton at rest).

Profile 40×40 (40 mm by 40 mm, with 8 mm grooves) extruded aluminum profile and the T-slot nuts to fit into them comprised the first modular system developed for use in mechanical engineering in 1980 by item Industrietechnik. The item aluminum framing system has since been expanded to include a variety of t-slot nuts that have been designed for specific applications.

The item system is very similar to the "channel-and-groove design" used in some toys.

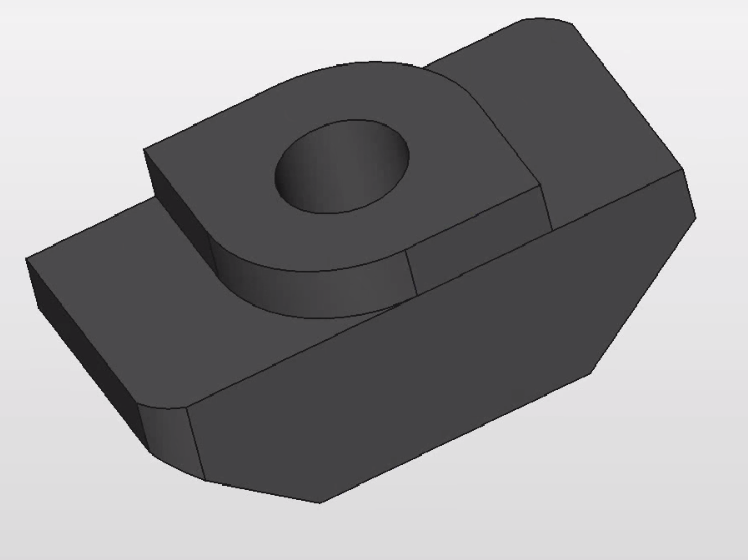
CAD model of a rotating T-nut used with aluminum T-slots/ T-track/ extrusions

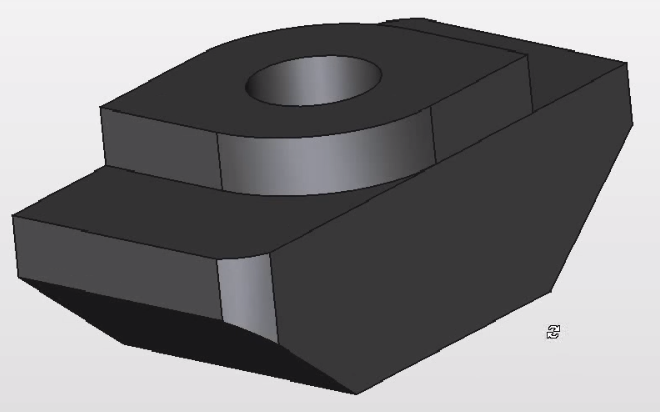

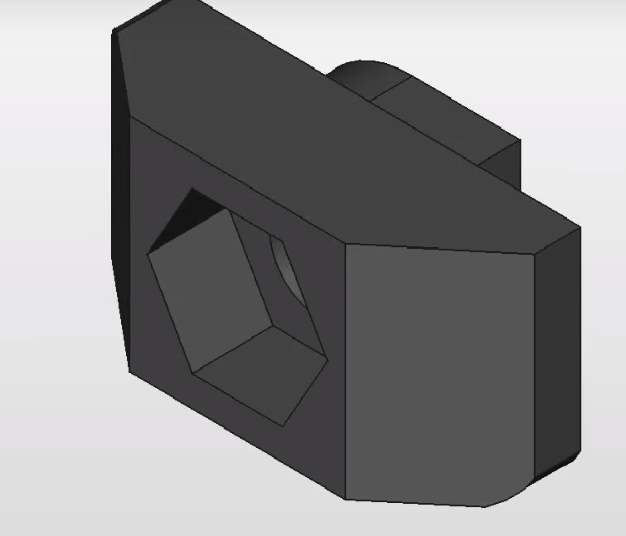

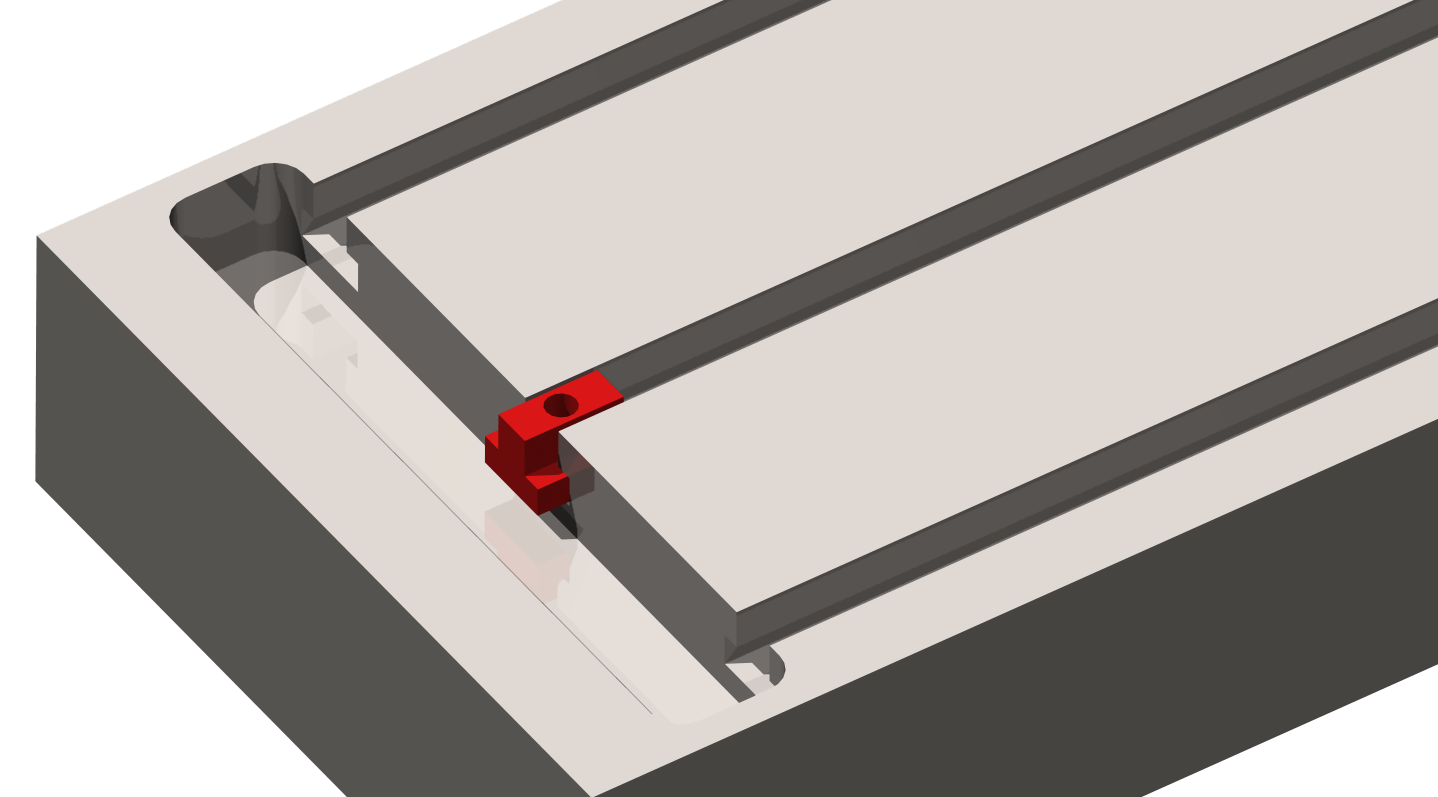
T-nut (red) installed in a T-Slot
