= Sex bolt =

Type of mating fastener

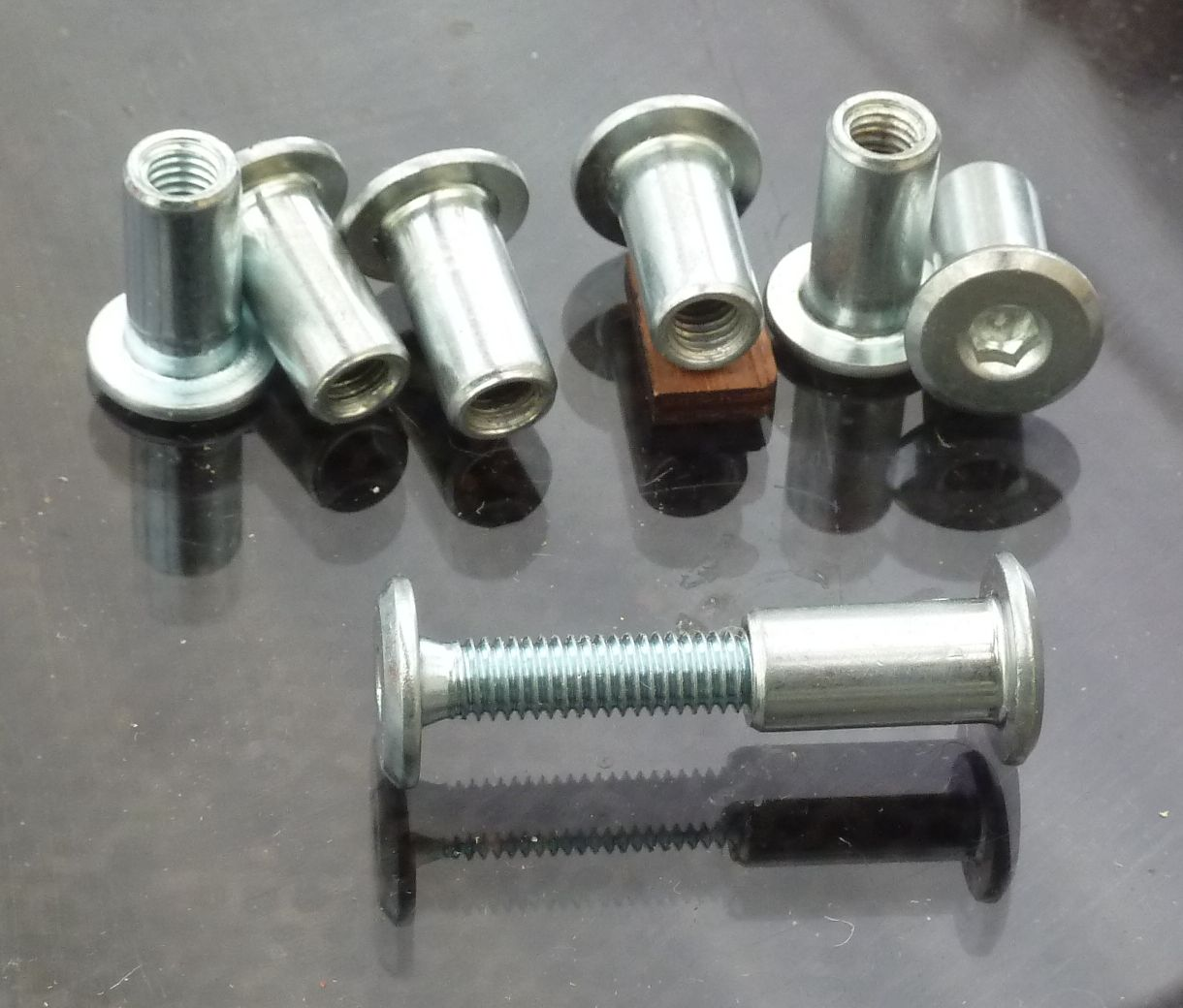
Sleeve nuts, one with mating bolt

A sex bolt is a type of fastener comprising a mated pair of screw and post, which are a machine screw and a nut that is barrel-shaped. The nut has a flange and a protruding boss that is internally threaded. The bolt (mated pair, screw and post) sits within the components being fastened, and the flange provides the bearing surface.

A sex bolt is normally chosen because of the low profile of its nut compared with that of other nuts. The sex bolt often has a built-in feature, such as a slot, to aid in tightening the fastener. Some sex bolts, more commonly known as "architectural bolts", have knurled barrels to allow one-sided assembly.

The sex bolt consists of a female (internally) threaded barrel (nut) and a male (externally) threaded screw. Both the barrel and screw have heads designed to clamp (bind) material between the head of the barrel and the head of the screw, or to bridge the gap between two parts.

Other names for sex bolts, or (in some cases) for the female half specifically, include:

- architectural bolts,
- barrel bolts,
- barrel nuts,
- binding barrels,
- book screws or book binding screws,
- Chicago screws, or Chicago binding screws and posts,
- connector bolts,
- female screws,
- posts and screws, screws and posts, or screw-in-post fasteners,
- sleeve nuts
- splint screws.

Applications vary widely from book binding to installing bathroom partitions. This group of fasteners are used to assemble fitness apparatus, solar panels, playground equipment, railing systems, furniture, athletic helmets, knives, store fixtures, signs, panic bars, and many other products.

Technical guide to mating fasteners:

Barrel diameter
mating fasteners often are going through pre-drilled holes. The barrel diameter should be slightly less than the installation hole.
Barrel length
the barrel length is measured from underneath the head to the end of the barrel. Normally the length of the barrel is shorter than the thickness of the material being clamped. Another common term is "grip length", which is the thickness of the material that a mating bolt can effectively fasten or clamp.
Thread size
length and thread class fit for both barrel and screw. The more thread depth, the more difficult these parts are to manufacture, and the more expensive.
Head style
the most common head style for a mating fastener is a "truss" head. Other head styles are button, flat, grommet, hex head, large truss, low profile, oval, rivet and T-head.
Drive systems
mating fasteners are available in a variety of drives such as slotted, socket, Phillips, combination Phillips/slotted, as well as tamper-resistant drives: one way, 6-lobe with pin and drilled spanner.
Material and finish
mating fasteners are available in aluminium, steel, brass, copper, stainless steel and plastic materials. Barrels and screws are available anodized, zinc-plated, brass-plated, chrome-plated, bronze-plated, nickel-plated and black-oxide finish.
