= Plate nut =

Stamped sheet metal nut that is usually riveted to a workpiece

A plate nut, also known as a nut plate, anchor nut or anchor plate, is a stamped sheet metal nut that is usually riveted to a workpiece. They have a long tube that is internally threaded and a plate with two clearance holes for rivets. The most popular versions have two lugs and they exist as fixed anchor nuts and as floating anchor nuts. The latter allows the nut to move slightly and so enlarges the positioning tolerances of the mounted parts. They were originally developed for the aerospace industry but are now also common in automotive racing.

Locknut types are available, which utilize deformed threads or a nylon locking element, much like a nyloc nut. These locking plate nuts are used when the nut is subjected to constant changes in environment or to vibration. The nylon insert expands and stops vibrations of the nut and acts as a locking arrangement. Other types have a floating nut or replaceable locking elements. A typical U.S. military specification for plate nuts is MS21047.

== See also ==
- Rivet nut
- Speed nut
- Swage nut
