= Coupling nut =

Threaded fastener for joining two male threads

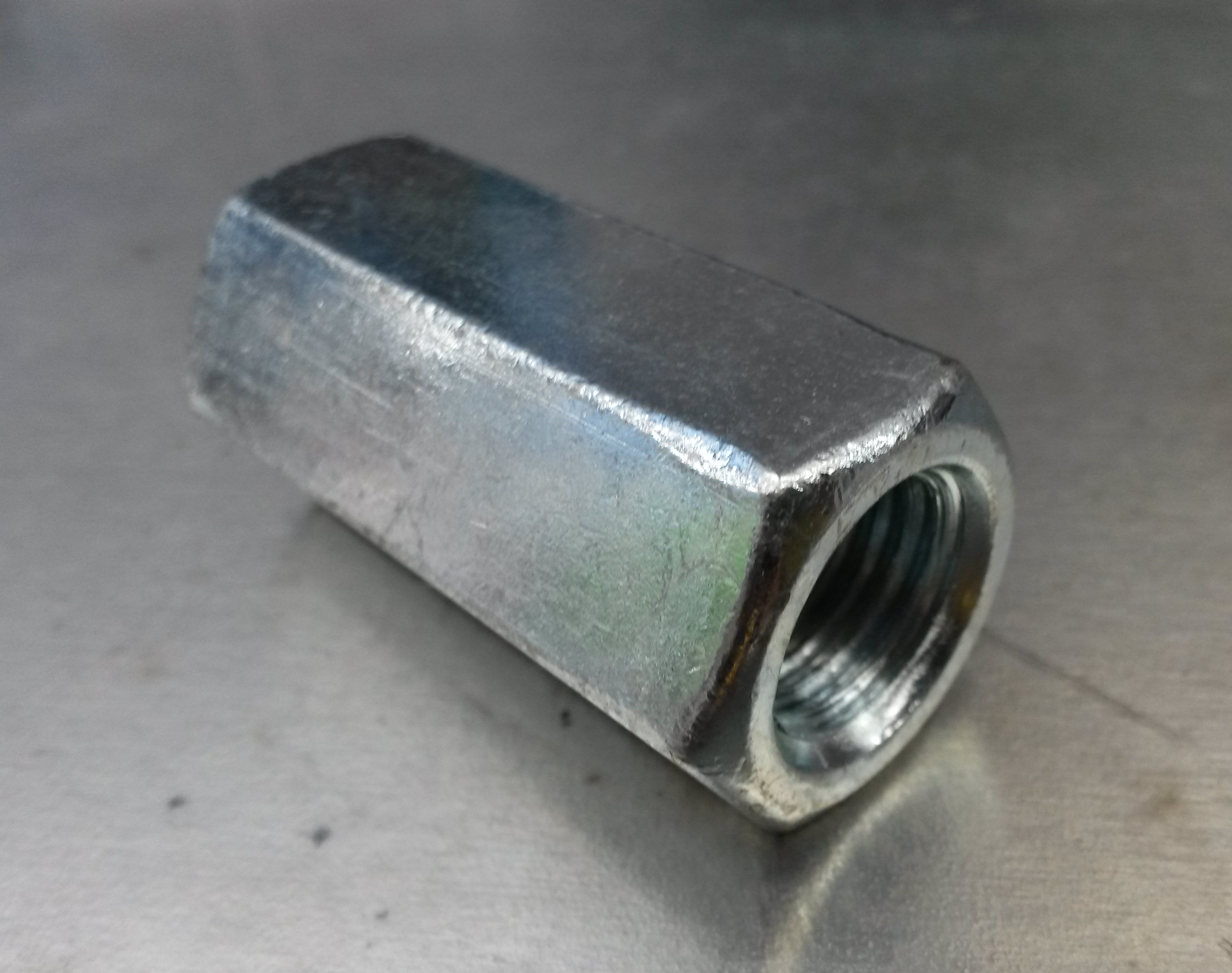
A coupling nut

A coupling nut and its orthographic view

A coupling nut, also known as extension nut, is a threaded fastener for joining two male threads, most commonly a threaded rod, but also pipes. The outside of the fastener is usually hexagonal so a wrench can hold it. Variations include reducing coupling nuts, for joining two different size threads; sight hole coupling nuts, which have a sight hole for observing the amount of engagement; and coupling nuts with left-handed threads.

Coupling nuts can be used to tighten a rod assembly inward or to press a rod assembly outward.

Along with bolts or studs, coupling nuts are also often used to make homemade bearing and seal pullers/presses. The advantage of a connecting nut over a standard nut in this application is that, due to its length, a greater number of threads are engaged with the bolt. This helps to spread the force over a larger number of threads, which reduces the possibility of stripping or galling the threads under a heavy load.
