= Knurled nut =

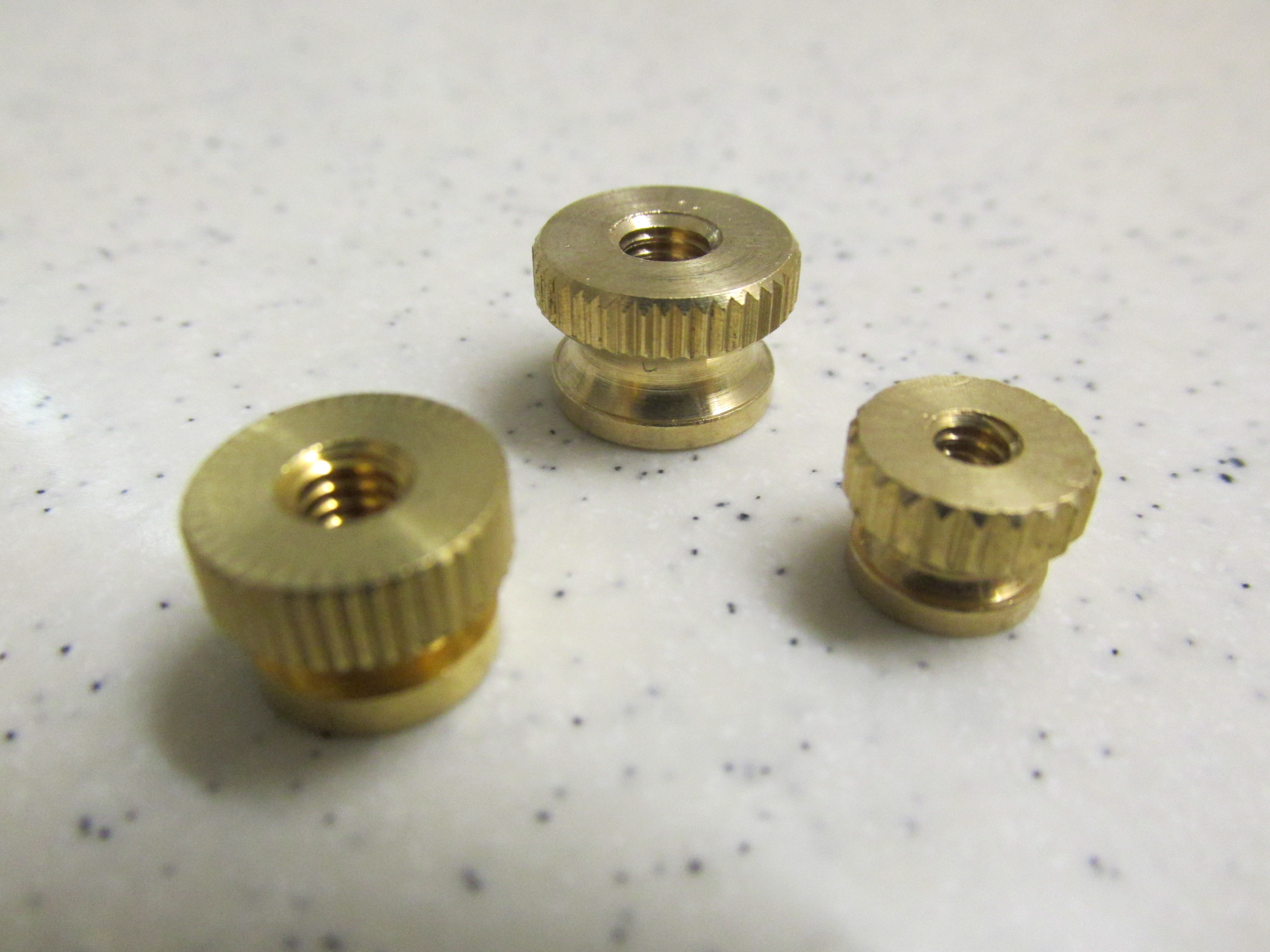
Thumb nuts

A knurled nut is a nut with a knurled outside surface. This facilitates tightening by hand (thumb nut) or secures the nut into a handle or cover (insertion nut).

== Uses ==
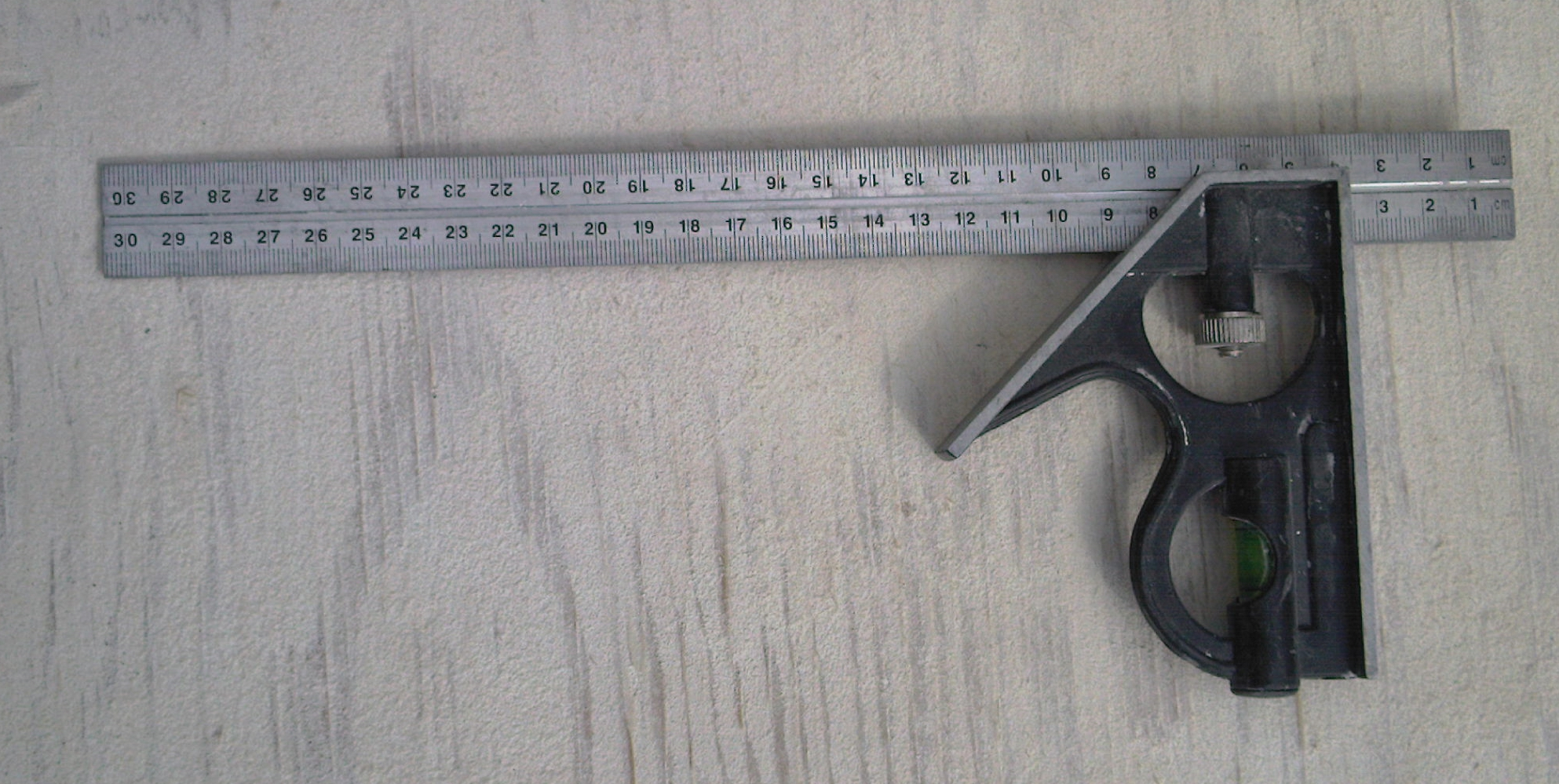
Square with knurled nut

Knurled nuts are commonly used in any application where the fasteners will be removed regularly but not needed for structural support. They can commonly be found on electrical panel covers, precision measuring tools, squares, and service covers. The advantages of using a knurled fastener in this situation are: it improves the ease of removal, deters the possibly over-tightening/stripping, and does not require any tools to manipulate the fastener. However, there are knurled nuts available that have a slot cut into them for the use of a Phillips head screwdriver. This expands the versatility of the nut and provides the option to use tools. Nuts with the Phillips slot are common in applications where vibration is a concern.
