= Patch point =

In electronic audio technology, a patch point is a connection that allows a signal to be withdrawn from a device, modified in some way, and returned. This can, for example, be done using a phone connector, using the tip of the plug for the outgoing mono signal, and the ring for the returning signal, a configuration known as "tip send, ring return". It is commonly known as an insert on professional audio mixing consoles.
