= T-nut =

Nut used in woodworking

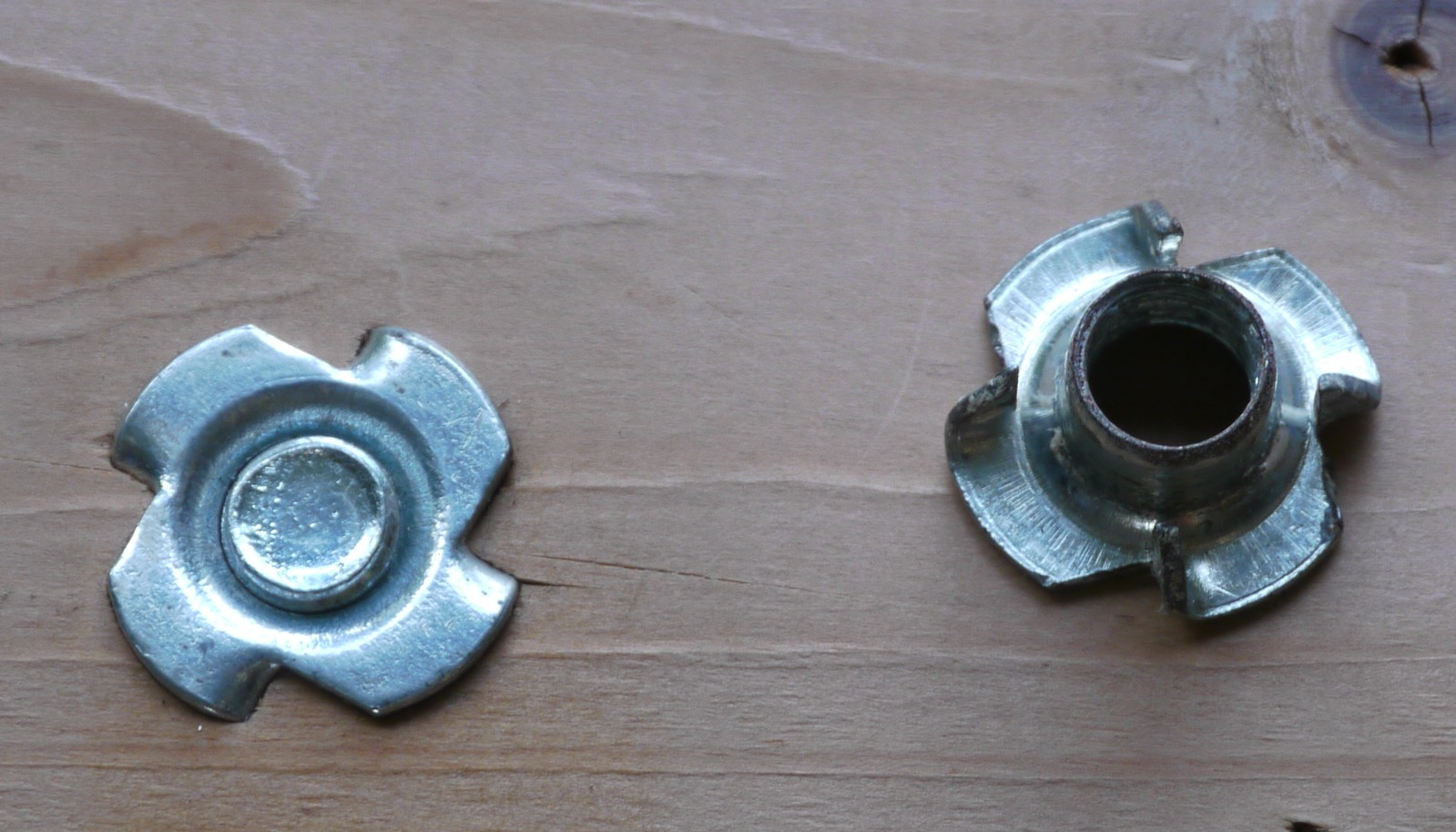
T-nuts. The left one has been inserted in the wood and a bolt has been screwed in from the other side.

A T-nut, T nut, or tee nut (also known as a blind nut, which can however also refer to a rivet nut or an insert nut, and likewise drive-in nut) is a type of nut used to fasten a wood, particle or composite materials workpiece, leaving a flush surface.

It has a long, thin body and a flange at one end, resembling a T in profile. The flanges of T-nuts often have hooks or serrations on the prongs that dig into a wooden work piece as the bolt is tightened from the opposite side of the piece, providing better retention.

In 1969, the first four-prong T-nut with an eight-sided base was patented. Unlike standard round base T-nuts, eight-sided T-nuts can be fed efficiently and reliably via machine. The eight-sided T-nut base has become the standard configuration for T-nuts inserted by machine.

== See also ==
- T-slot nuts, which are used in work-holding in machine tools. T-slot nuts fit in T-section slots in the machine work-table and are used in conjunction with studs and clamps to provide flexible means of holding workpieces in place.
- Weld nuts, which are similar in appearance to t-nuts. They lack the prongs which penetrate into wood. Weld nuts are usually spot-welded into place on metal.
