= Threaded insert =

Fastener element inserted into a hole to provide threading for screws

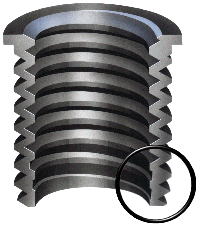
TIME-SERT insert

A threaded insert, also known as a threaded bushing or insert nut, is a fastener element that is inserted into an object to add a threaded hole. They may be used to repair a stripped threaded hole, provide a durable threaded hole in a soft material, place a thread on a material too thin to accept it, mold or cast threads into a work piece thereby eliminating a machining operation, or simplify changeover from unified to metric threads or vice versa.

In woodworking, an insert nut provides a threaded socket for a wooden workpiece, similar to a wall anchor. Insert nuts are inserted into a pre-drilled hole by one of two means: screw in and hammer in. In both cases, the external protrusions bite into the wood, preventing the nut from either turning or pulling out.

== Types ==
Thread inserts come in many varieties, depending on the application. Threaded inserts for plastics are used in plastic materials and applied with thermal insertion or ultrasonic welding machines.

Manufacturers of ready-to-assemble furniture often ship the parts with threaded inserts and other kinds of knock-down fasteners pre-installed.

People who use sheet metal or sandwich panel or honeycomb sandwich-structured composite often install threaded inserts to spread shear, tension, and torque loads over a larger area of the material.

=== Captive nut ===
Captive nuts come in two basic styles. One type, the cage nut or clip-on nut is a conventional nut held captive by a sheet metal carrier that clips onto the part to be connected. These are generally used to attach screws to sheet metal parts too thin to be threaded, and they can generally be attached, removed and reused with simple hand tools.

The second type of captive nut is a threaded insert. These are either pressed into holes in the material to be joined or moulded in. In either case, part of the insert is generally knurled to get a good grip on the material supporting the insert. One variant, the swage nut, has a knurled portion that swages the sides of a soft metal hole to more tightly grip the nut. Press fit and swaged captive nuts are used in panels that are too thin to be threaded or in soft materials that are too weak to be threaded. They are installed by pressing them in with an arbor press.

Threaded inserts are commonly used in plastic casings, housing, and parts to create a metal thread (typically: brass or stainless steel) to allow for screws to be used in the assembly of many consumer electronics and consumer products. These may be cast in place in injection molded parts or they may be added by thermal insertion. In the latter, the insert is heated and then pressed into a hollow in the plastic part. The heat causes local melting in the plastic. Ultrasonic Insertion is the process used to apply vibration and pressure to install the threaded insert into a molded hollow boss (hole) of a plastic part. The ultrasonic vibrations melt the thermoplastic material where the metal insert is in contact, and pressure is applied to press it into position. The material typically reforms around the knurled body of the threaded insert to ensure a good retention.

=== Externally-threaded inserts ===
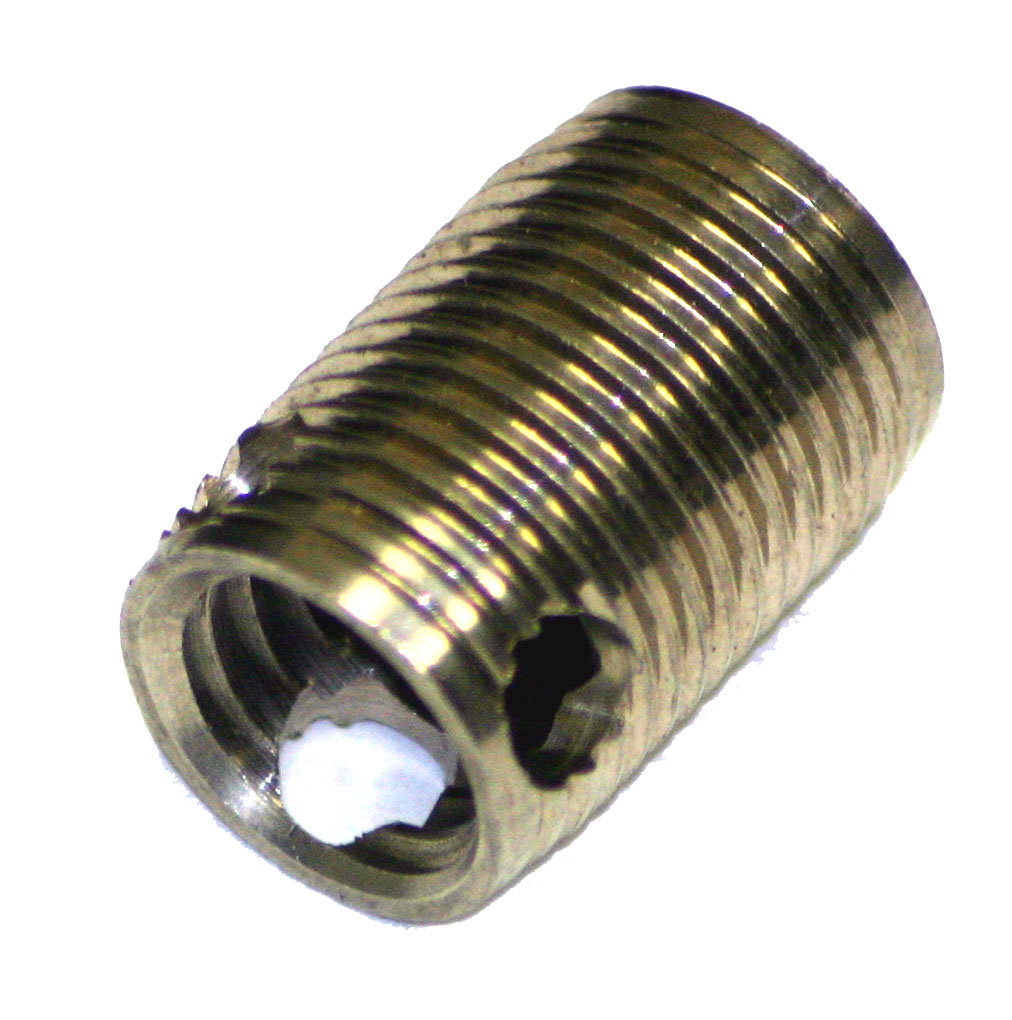
A self-tapping insert

An externally threaded insert has threads on the outside and inside. The insert can be threaded into a pre-tapped hole, or a self-tapping insert creates its own threads in a drilled or molded hole. It is then anchored by various means, such as a nylon locking element. Inserts that are anchored via Loctite are more commonly known by the trademarked name E-Z Lok. A thin-walled solid-bushing insert by the trademarked name TIME-SERT is locked in by rolling the bottom few internal thread into the base material with a special install driver which will permanently lock the insert in place. Key-locking inserts, more commonly known by the trademarked name Keenserts, use keys that are hammered into grooves through the threads, permanently locking the insert. Inserts that are self-tapping and lock via friction are more commonly known by the trademarked names Tap-lok or Speedserts.

=== Helical insert ===
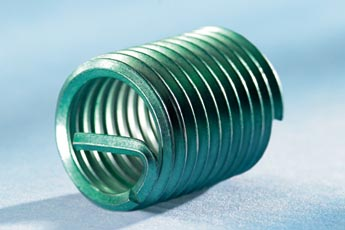
A helical insert. The straight radial piece is the driver tang which is used to grip the coil while driving it into place. It is broken off and is discarded after installation.

A helical insert (also called a screw thread insert (STI), although most users call them all by one of the prominent brand names: KATO®, Heli-Coil^{®} or Recoil^{®}) is an insert made of stainless steel or phosphor bronze wire, with a diamond cross section, coiled to form inner and outer threads. The coil of wire screws into a threaded hole, where it forms a smaller-diameter internal thread for a screw or stud. These inserts provide a convenient means of repairing stripped internal threads. These inserts are commonly sold in kits with matched taps and insert tools.

In soft materials, they are used to provide stronger threads than can be obtained by direct tapping of the base materials, e.g. aluminium, zinc die castings, wood, magnesium, plastic.

An example application is engine repair after unintentionally destroying the threads in a socket for a spark plug by over-torquing or cross-threading.

=== Mold-in inserts ===
A mold-in insert has a specially shaped outer surface to anchor the insert in plastic. For injection-molded plastic, the insert is placed in a mold before it is filled with plastic, making an integral part. An insert can also be heated and pressed into pre-made thermoplastic material.

For softer, more pliable plastics, hexagonal or square inserts with deep and wide grooves allow the softer plastics to hold the inserts sufficiently. The process allows large product manufacture i.e. fuel tanks, boats etc., so the torque inserts may be of large thread sizes.

=== Press-fit inserts ===
A press-fit insert is internally threaded and has a knurled outer surface. It is pressed into a plain hole with an arbor press.

=== Potted inserts ===
A potted insert is set in epoxy to fix it, such as in a honeycomb sandwich panel, often used in commercial aircraft, and is said to be potted in.

=== Rivet nut ===
A rivet nut, also known as a blind rivet nut, or rivnut, is a one-piece internally threaded and counterbored tubular rivet that can be anchored entirely from one side.

== Strength factors of threaded inserts ==
Pull-out resistance & torque-out resistance are the two main strength factors of threaded inserts.

- Pull-out resistance: the force required to begin to pull the insert out of the parent material
- Torque-out: the amount of torque required to begin to turn the fastener

== Installation methods ==
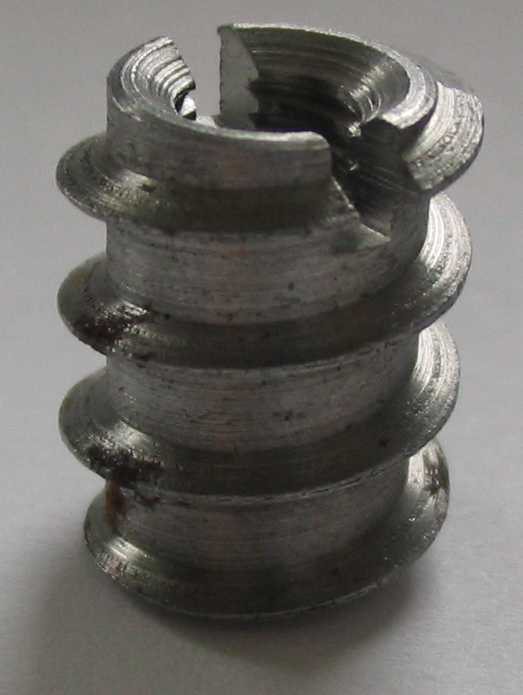
Rampa- or screw-in nut

For industrial purposes, the following installation methods are the standards:

- Thermal insertion
- Injection molding
- Manual pressing

For craft purposes, they might be:

- Screw-in type: Screw-in insert nuts have an external thread and hex head and are screwed in with a Flat Blade Screwdriver or an Allen wrench. The screw-in insert nuts come in various sizes and take different screw sizes. For example, an M6 insert nut will take an M6 bolt, a "1/4-20" insert nut will take a 1/4-20 inch bolt., etc The pre-drilled hole must be as deep as the length of the insert nut plus any portion of the bolt that may be screwed past the end of the nut in the work piece.
- Hammer-in type: Hammer-in insert nuts, also known as knock-in nuts, are lined with barbs and are hammered in. They are often made of steel, brass or nylon. They are designed to work in wood and particle board.

== See also ==
- Nut
- Rivet nut
- Screw
- Screw thread
