= Boss (engineering) =

Protruding feature on a workpiece

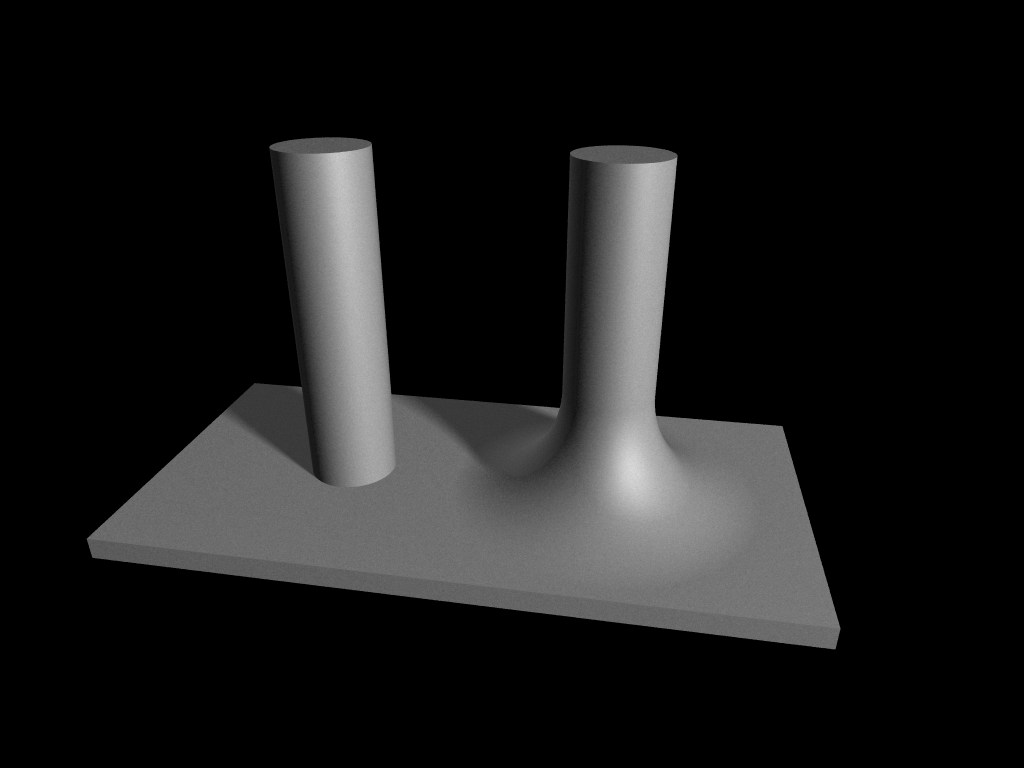
Two bosses in the form of cylinders on a mechanical part. The cylinder to the right is filleted near its base.

In engineering, a boss is a protruding feature on a workpiece. A common use for a boss is to locate one object within a pocket or hole of another object. For instance, some motors use a precisely machined boss on the front face to locate it on the mating part. Like a process on a bone, bosses on castings can provide attachment points or bearing surfaces.

The term 'boss' when used in engineering can also relate to a finishing edge around (usually) a circular opening that allows the opening to locate onto, or within another opening thus locating or joining two items together with a view to the location or joining being temporary or semi-permanent. A common everyday example of a boss is the housing of the rotation spindle in a washing machine drum, or on a cylinder lawn mower at the end of the cutting blade cylinder which may house a bearing set to allow the cylinder to rotate through one plane, but held firm in another plane.

A boss can also be a brass eyelet on a sail. It is a generic term to describe an item designed to facilitate the use with, within, on or around another item whereby one cannot operate properly without the other.

The word 'boss' is also often used to describe the end of a shaft on a boat to which a propeller might attach.

A boss may also refer to a mounting feature that will receive a screw or thread-forming screw.

In computer-aided design applications, a boss is a feature used to describe a type of extrusion.

The word boss comes from the Middle French word embocer, which means protuberance.

== Docking sleeve ==
A docking sleeve (or mounting boss) is a tube or enclosure used to couple two mechanical components together, or for chilling, or to retain two components together; this permits two equally sized appendages to be connected via insertion and fixing within the construction. Docking sleeves may be physically solid or flexible, their implementation varying widely according to the required application of the device. The most common application is the plastic appendage that receives a screw in order to attach two parts.

== See also ==
- Mortise and tenon, traditional method for connecting two pieces of wood
- Chamfer, a transitional straight edge between two faces of an object
- Fillet, a rounding of an interior or exterior corner between two faces of an object
- Draft, the amount of taper for molded or cast parts perpendicular to the parting line
