= Drilling =

Cutting process that uses a drill bit to cut a circular hole into the workpiece

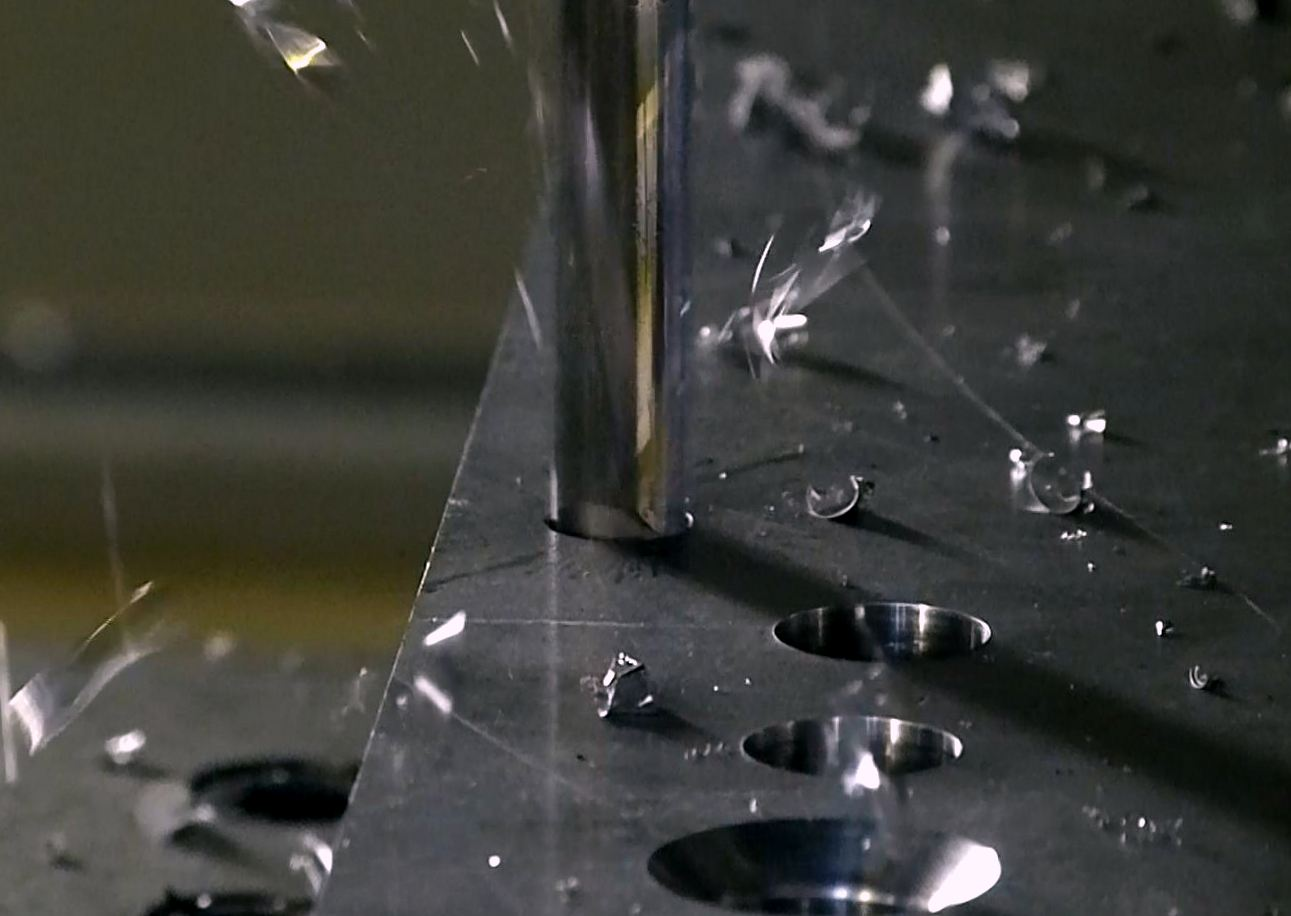
Titanium drilling

Drilling is a cutting process where a drill bit is spun to cut a hole of circular cross-section in solid materials. The drill bit is usually a rotary cutting tool, often multi-point. The bit is pressed against the work-piece and rotated at rates from hundreds to thousands of revolutions per minute. This forces the cutting edge against the work-piece, cutting off chips (swarf) from the hole as it is drilled.

In rock drilling, the hole is usually not made through a circular cutting motion, though the bit is usually rotated. Instead, the hole is usually made by hammering a drill bit into the hole with quickly repeated short movements. The hammering action can be performed from outside the hole (top-hammer drill) or within the hole (down-the-hole drill, DTH). Drills used for horizontal drilling are called drifter drills.

In rare cases, specially-shaped bits are used to cut holes of non-circular cross-section; a square cross-section is possible.

== Process ==
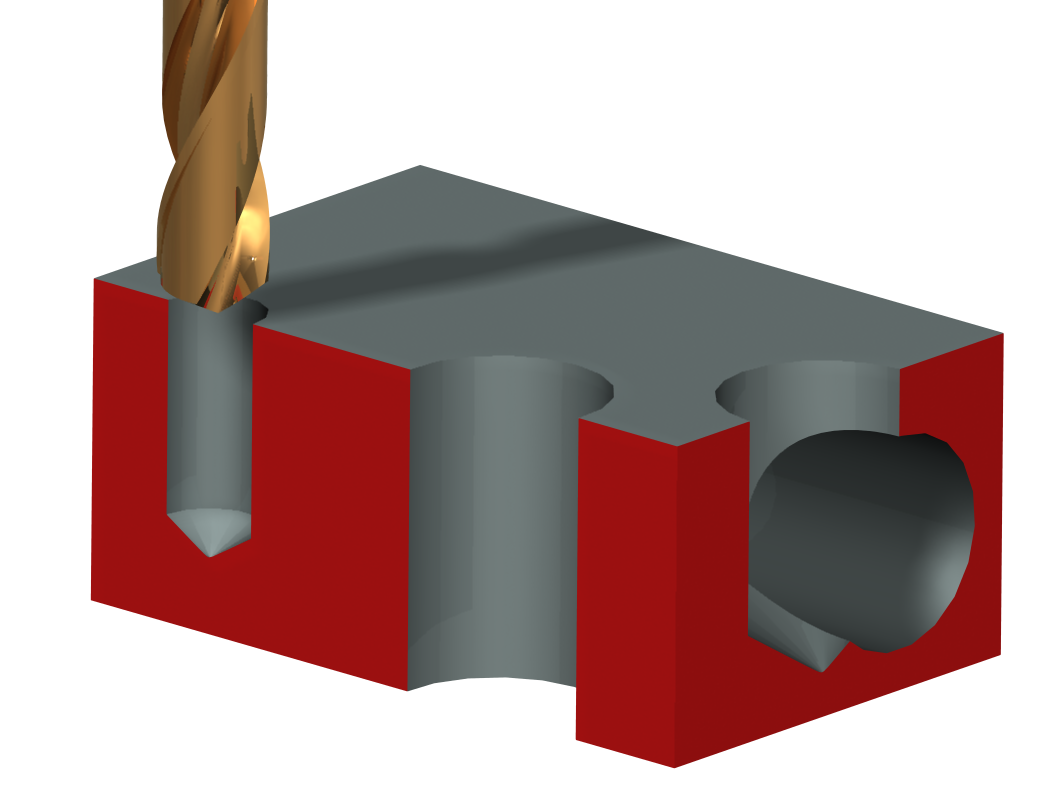
Hole types: Blind hole (left), through hole (middle), interrupted hole (right).

Drilled holes are characterized by their sharp edge on the entrance side and the presence of burrs on the exit side (unless they have been removed). Also, the inside of the hole usually has helical feed marks.

Drilling may affect the mechanical properties of the workpiece by creating low residual stresses around the hole opening and a very thin layer of highly stressed and disturbed material on the newly formed surface. This causes the workpiece to become more susceptible to corrosion and crack propagation at the stressed surface. A finish operation may be done to avoid these detrimental conditions.

For fluted drill bits, any chips are removed via the flutes. Chips may form long spirals or small flakes, depending on the material, and process parameters. The type of chips formed can be an indicator of the machinability of the material, with long chips suggesting good material machinability.

When possible drilled holes should be located perpendicular to the workpiece surface. This minimizes the drill bit's tendency to "walk", that is, to be deflected from the intended center-line of the bore, causing the hole to be misplaced. The higher the length-to-diameter ratio of the drill bit, the greater the tendency to walk. The tendency to walk is also preempted in various other ways, which include:

- Establishing a centering mark or feature before drilling, such as by:
  - Casting, molding, or forging a mark into the workpiece
  - Center punching
  - Spot drilling (i.e., center drilling)
  - Spot facing, which is machining a certain area on a casting or forging to establish an accurately located face on an otherwise rough surface.
- Constraining the position of the drill bit using a drill jig with drill bushings

Surface finish produced by drilling may range from 32 to 500 microinches. Finish cuts will generate surfaces near 32 microinches, and roughing will be near 500 microinches.

Cutting fluid is commonly used to cool the drill bit, increase tool life, increase speeds and feeds, increase the surface finish, and aid in ejecting chips. Application of these fluids is usually done by flooding the workpiece with coolant and lubricant or by applying a spray mist.

In deciding which drill(s) to use it is important to consider the task at hand and evaluate which drill would best accomplish the task. There are a variety of drill styles that each serve a different purpose. The subland drill is capable of drilling more than one diameter. The spade drill is used to drill larger hole sizes. The indexable drill is useful in managing chips.

=== Spot drilling ===
The purpose of spot drilling is to drill a hole that will act as a guide for drilling the final hole. The hole is only drilled part way into the workpiece because it is only used to guide the beginning of the next drilling process.

=== Centre drilling ===
Centre drill is a two-fluted tool consisting of a twist drill with a 60° countersink; used to drill countersunk center holes in a workpiece to be mounted between centers for turning or grinding.

=== Deep hole drilling ===
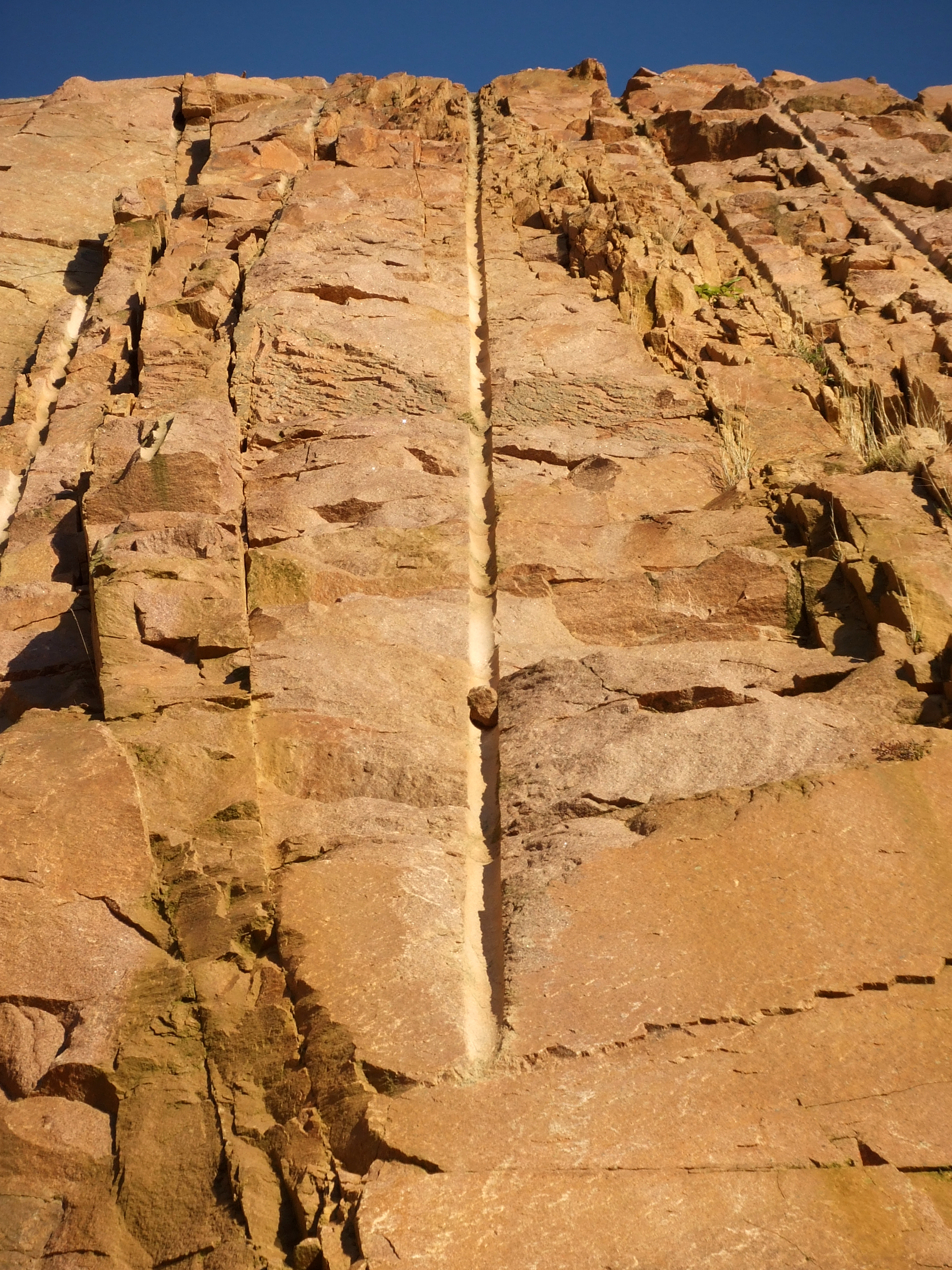
Blast hole several meters long, drilled in granite

Deep hole drilling is defined as drilling a hole of depth greater than ten times the diameter of the hole. These types of holes require special equipment to maintain the straightness and tolerances. Other considerations are roundness and surface finish.

Deep hole drilling is generally achievable with a few tooling methods, usually gun drilling or BTA drilling. These are differentiated due to the coolant entry method (internal or external) and chip removal method (internal or external). Using methods such as a rotating tool and counter-rotating workpiece are common techniques to achieve required straightness tolerances. Secondary tooling methods include trepanning, skiving and burnishing, pull boring, or bottle boring. Finally, a new kind of drilling technology is available to face this issue: vibration drilling. This technology breaks up the chips by a small controlled axial vibration of the drill. The small chips are easily removed by the flutes of the drill.

A high tech monitoring system is used to control force, torque, vibrations, and acoustic emission. Vibration is considered a major defect in deep hole drilling which can often cause the drill to break. A special coolant is usually used to aid in this type of drilling.

==== Gun drilling ====
Gun drilling was originally developed to drill out gun barrels and is used commonly for drilling smaller diameter deep holes. The depth-to-diameter ratio can be even greater than 300:1. The key feature of gun drilling is that the bits are self-centering; this is what allows for such deep accurate holes. The bits use a rotary motion similar to a twist drill; however, the bits are designed with bearing pads that slide along the surface of the hole keeping the drill bit on center. Gun drilling is usually done at high speeds and low feed rates.

==== Trepanning ====
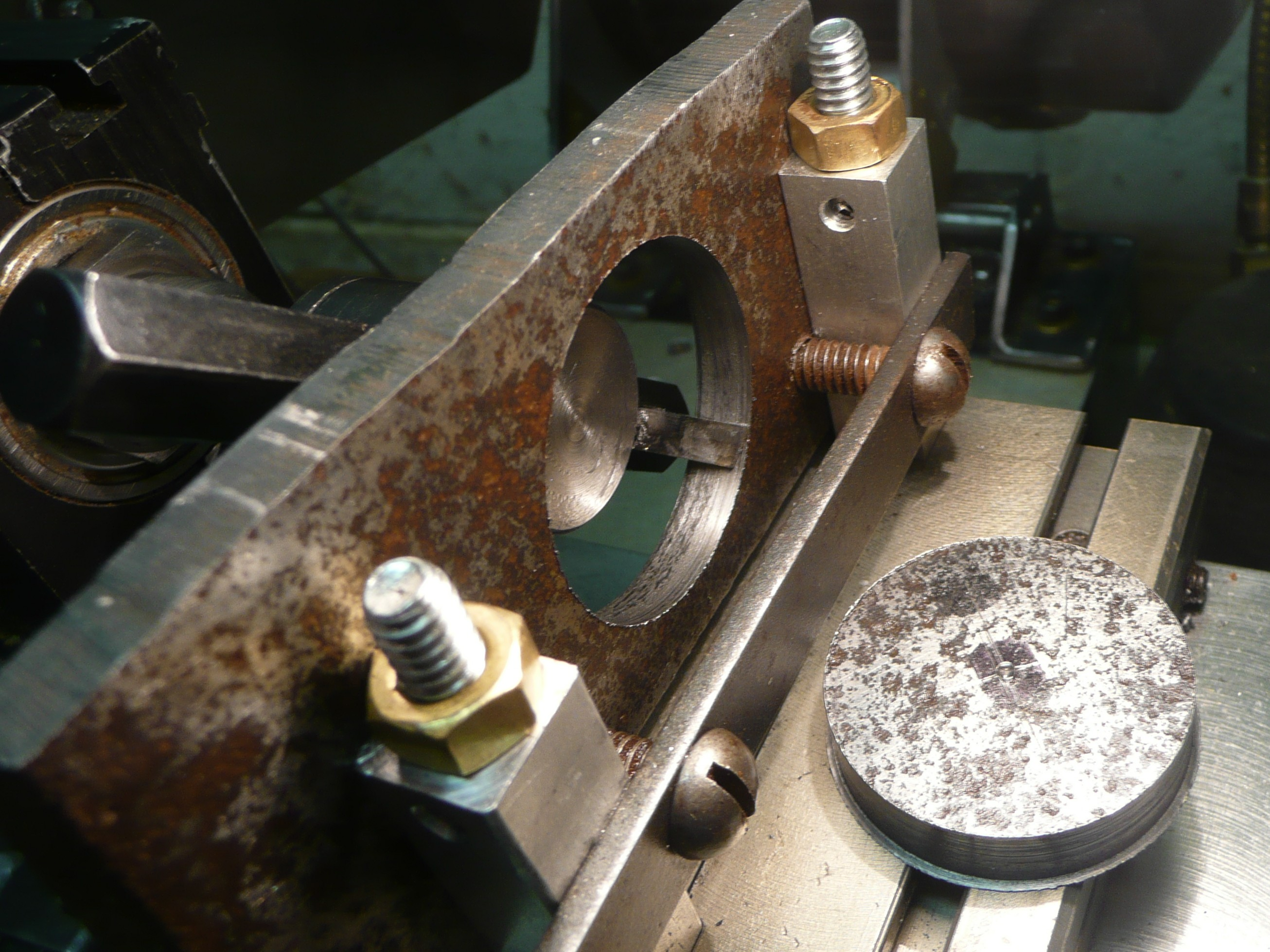
Trepanned hole in steel plate, with the plug removed and the tool that cut it; in this case the tool-holder is mounted on a lathe headstock while the workpiece is mounted on the cross slide.

Trepanning is commonly used for creating larger diameter holes (up to 915 mm (36.0 in)) where a standard drill bit is not feasible or economical. Trepanning removes the desired diameter by cutting out a solid disk similar to the workings of a drafting compass. Trepanning is performed on flat products such as sheet metal, granite (curling stone), plates, or structural members like I-beams. Trepanning can also be useful to make grooves for inserting seals, such as O-rings.

=== Microdrilling ===
Microdrilling refers to the drilling of holes less than 0.5 mm (0.020 in). Drilling of holes at this small diameter presents greater problems since coolant fed drills cannot be used and high spindle speeds are required. High spindle speeds that exceed 10,000 RPM also require the use of balanced tool holders.

=== Vibration drilling ===
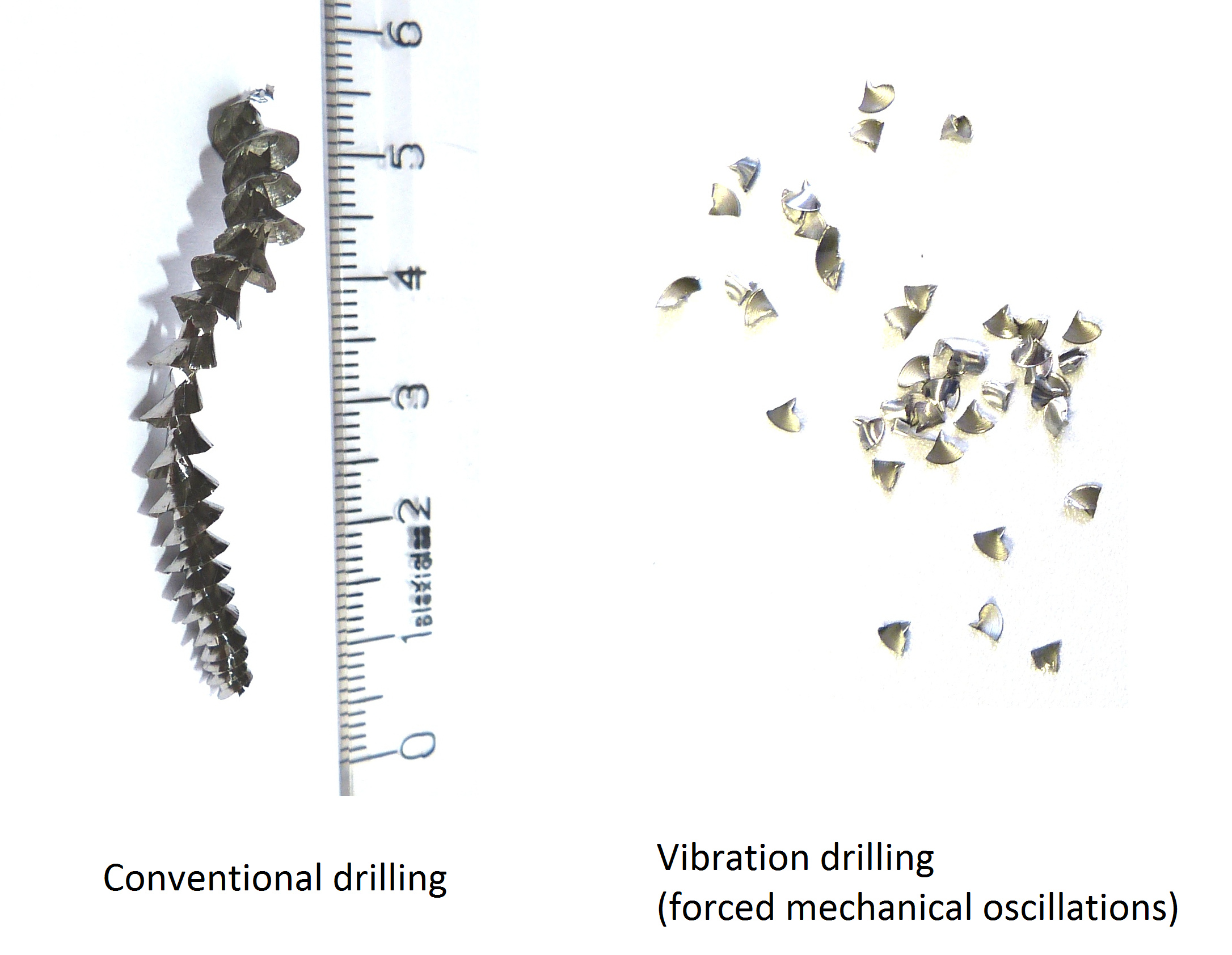
Titanium chips – conventional drilling vs vibration drilling

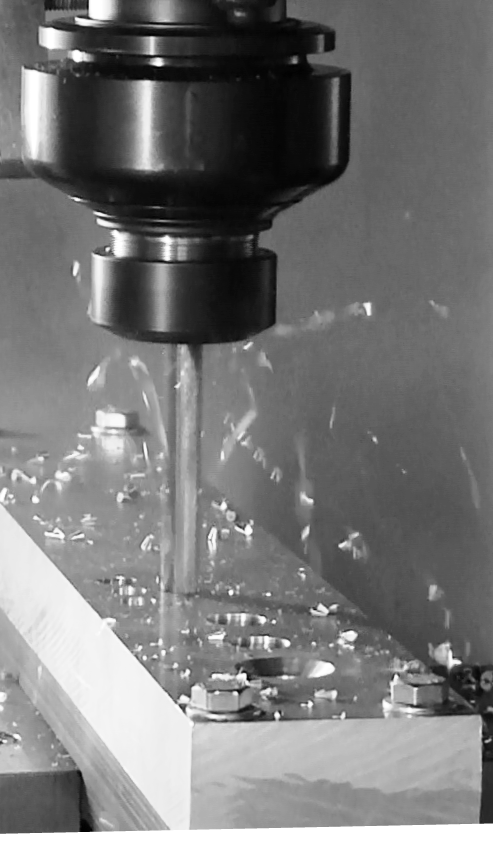
Vibration drilling of an aluminum-CFRP multi-material stack with MITIS technology

The first studies into vibration drilling began in the 1950s (Pr. V.N. Poduraev, Moscow Bauman University). The main principle consists in axial vibrations or oscillations in addition to the feed movement of the drill so that the chips break up and are then easily removed from the cutting zone.

There are two main technologies of vibration drilling: self-maintained vibration systems and forced vibration systems. Most vibration drilling technologies are still at a research stage. In the case of self-maintained vibration drilling, the eigenfrequency of the tool is used in order to make it naturally vibrate while cutting; vibrations are self-maintained by a mass-spring system included in the tool holder. Other works use a piezoelectric system to generate and control the vibrations. These systems allow high vibration frequencies (up to 2 kHz) for small magnitude (about a few micrometers); they are particularly suitable for drilling small holes. Finally, vibrations can be generated by mechanical systems: the frequency is given by the combination of the rotation speed and the number of oscillation per rotation (a few oscillations per rotation), with magnitude about 0.1 mm.

This last technology is a fully industrial one (example: SineHoling® technology of MITIS). Vibration drilling is a preferred solution in situations like deep hole drilling, multi-material stack drilling (aeronautics) and dry drilling (without lubrication). Generally, it provides improved reliability and greater control of the drilling operation.

=== Circle interpolating ===
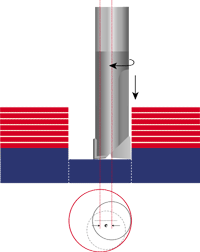
The orbital drilling principle

Circle interpolating, also known as orbital drilling, is a process for creating holes using machine cutters.

Orbital drilling is based on rotating a cutting tool around its own axis and simultaneously about a centre axis which is off-set from the axis of the cutting tool. The cutting tool can then be moved simultaneously in an axial direction to drill or machine a hole – and/or combined with an arbitrary sidewards motion to machine an opening or cavity.

By adjusting the offset, a cutting tool of a specific diameter can be used to drill holes of different diameters as illustrated. This implies that the cutting tool inventory can be substantially reduced.

The term orbital drilling comes from that the cutting tool “orbits” around the hole center. The mechanically forced, dynamic offset in orbital drilling has several advantages compared to conventional drilling that drastically increases the hole precision. The lower thrust force results in a burr-less hole when drilling in metals. When drilling in composite materials the problem with delamination is eliminated.

== Material ==
=== Drilling in metal ===
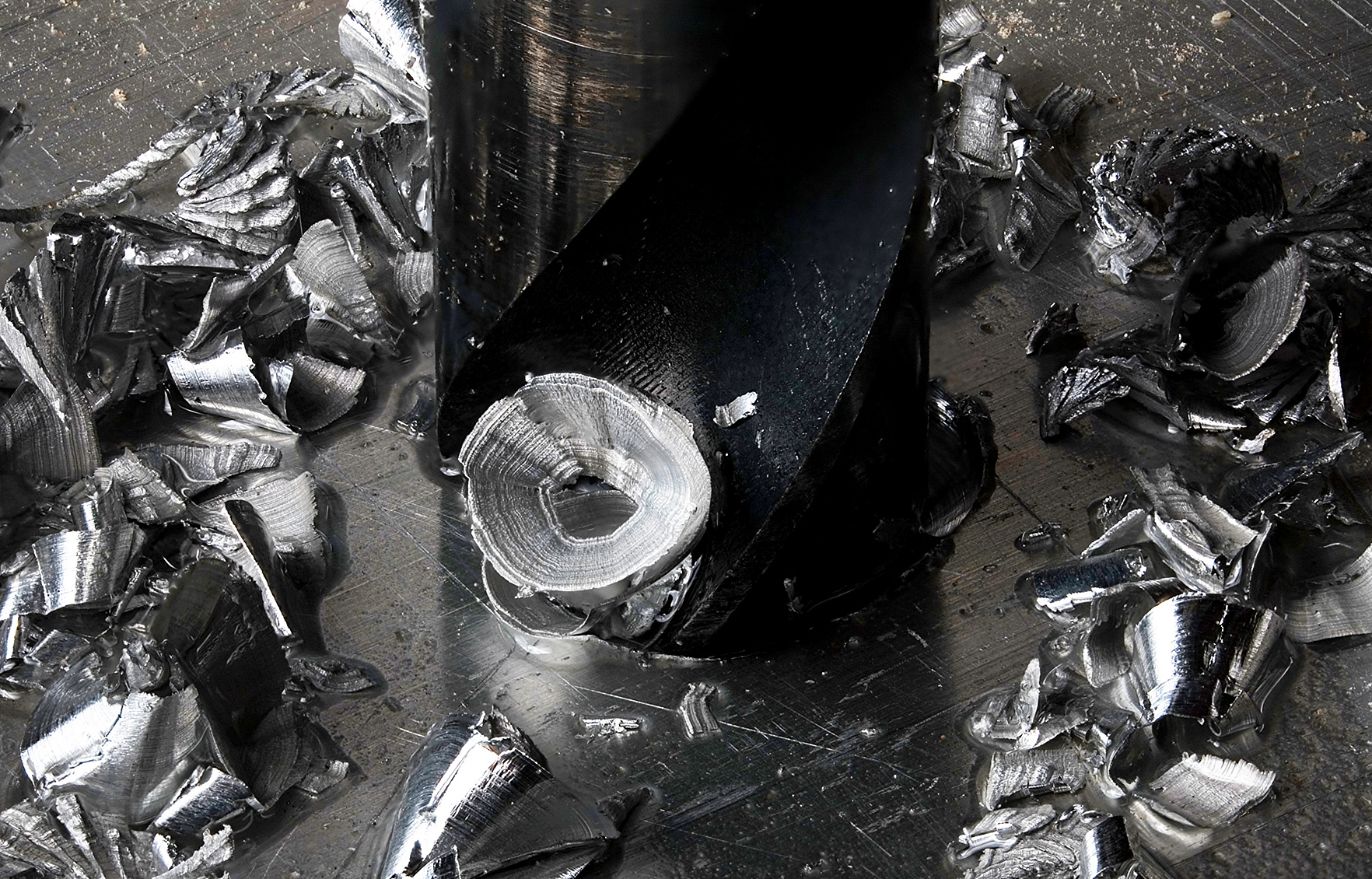
High-speed steel twist bit drilling into aluminium with methylated spirits lubricant

Under normal usage, swarf is carried up and away from the tip of the drill bit by the fluting of the drill bit. The cutting edges produce more chips which continue the movement of the chips outwards from the hole. This is successful until the chips pack too tightly, either because of deeper than normal holes or insufficient backing off (removing the drill slightly or totally from the hole while drilling). Cutting fluid is sometimes used to ease this problem and to prolong the tool's life by cooling and lubricating the tip and chip flow. Coolant may be introduced via holes through the drill shank, which is common when using a gun drill. When cutting aluminum in particular, cutting fluid helps ensure a smooth and accurate hole while preventing the metal from grabbing the drill bit in the process of drilling the hole. When cutting brass, and other soft metals that can grab the drill bit and causes "chatter", a face of approx. 1-2 millimeters can be ground on the cutting edge to create an obtuse angle of 91 to 93 degrees. This prevents "chatter" during which the drill tears rather than cuts the metal. However, with that shape of bit cutting edge, the drill is pushing the metal away, rather than grabbing the metal. This creates high friction and very hot swarf.

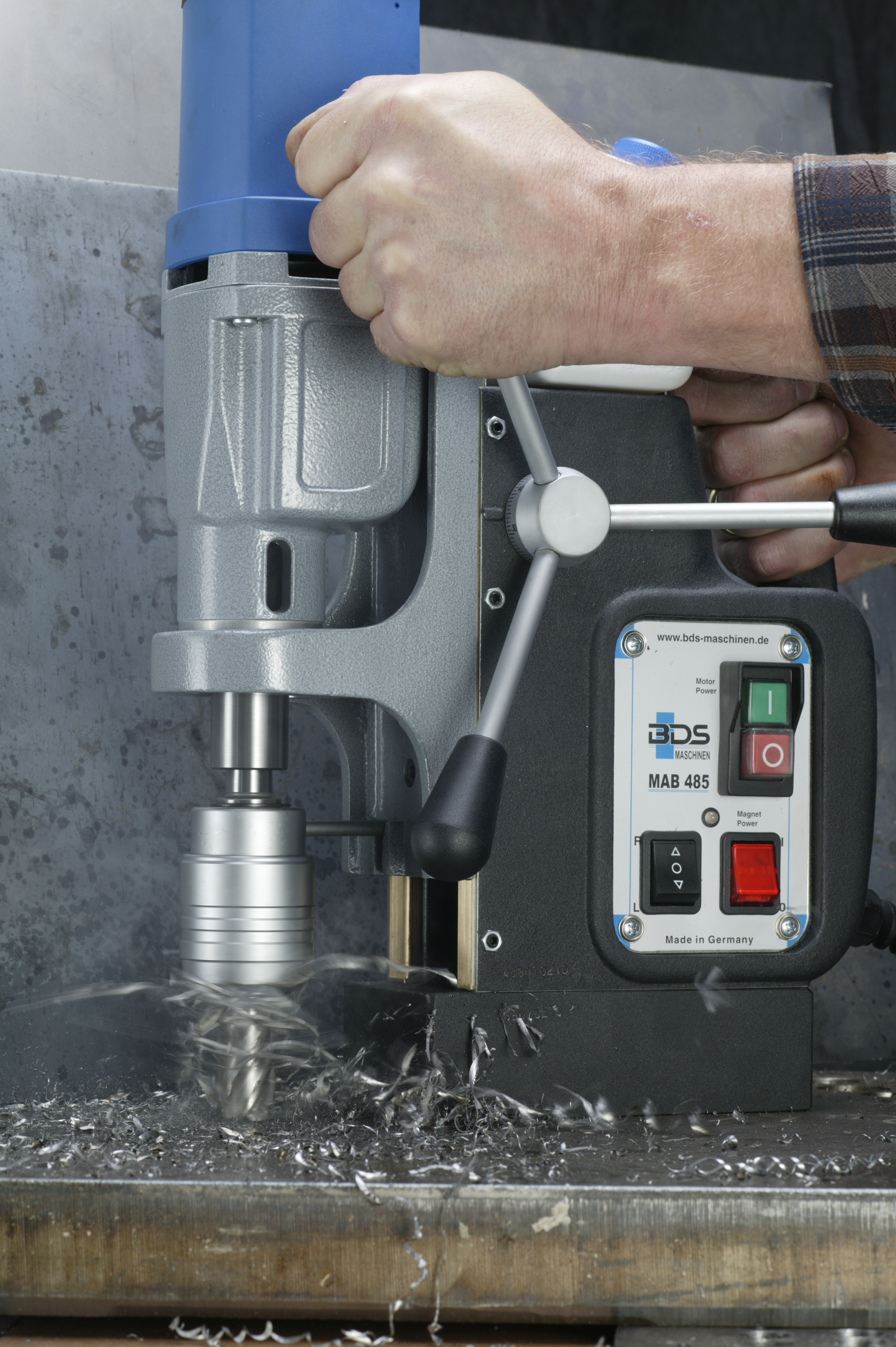
Magnetic Drilling Machine (manufactured by BDS Maschinen GmbH, Germany)

For heavy feeds and comparatively deep holes oil-hole drills are used in the drill bit, with a lubricant pumped to the drill head through a small hole in the bit and flowing out along the fluting. A conventional drill press arrangement can be used in oil-hole drilling, but it is more commonly seen in automatic drilling machinery in which it is the workpiece that rotates rather than the drill bit.

In computer numerical control (CNC) machine tools a process called peck drilling, or interrupted cut drilling, is used to keep swarf from detrimentally building up when drilling deep holes (approximately when the depth of the hole is three times greater than the drill diameter). Peck drilling involves plunging the drill part way through the workpiece, no more than five times the diameter of the drill, and then retracting it to the surface. This is repeated until the hole is finished. A modified form of this process, called high speed peck drilling or chip breaking, only retracts the drill slightly. This process is faster, but is only used in moderately long holes, otherwise it will overheat the drill bit. It is also used when drilling stringy material to break the chips.

When it is not possible to bring the material to the СNС machine, a Magnetic Base Drilling Machine may be used. The base allows drilling in a horizontal position and even on a ceiling. Usually, for these machines, it is better to use cutters because they can drill much faster with less speed. Cutter sizes vary from 12mm to 200mm DIA and from 30mm to 200mm DOC(depth of cut). These machines are widely used in construction, fabrication, marine, and oil & gas industries. In the oil and gas industry, pneumatic magnetic drilling machines are used to avoid sparks, as well as special tube magnetic drilling machines that can be fixed on pipes of different sizes, even inside. Heavy-duty plate drilling machines provide high-quality solutions in the manufacturing of steel construction, bridge construction, shipyards, and various fields of the construction sector.

=== Drilling in wood ===
Wood being softer than most metals, drilling in wood is considerably easier and faster than drilling in metal. Cutting fluids are not used or needed. The main issue in drilling wood is ensuring clean entry and exit holes and preventing burning. Avoiding burning is a question of using sharp bits and the appropriate cutting speed. Drill bits can tear out chips of wood around the top and bottom of the hole and this is undesirable in fine woodworking applications.

The ubiquitous twist drill bits used in metalworking also work well in wood, but they tend to chip wood out at the entry and exit of the hole. In some cases, as in holes for rough carpentry, the quality of the hole does not matter, and a number of bits for fast cutting in wood exist, including spade bits and self-feeding auger bits. Many types of specialised drill bits for boring clean holes in wood have been developed, including brad-point bits, Forstner bits and hole saws. Chipping on exit can be minimized by using a piece of wood as backing behind the work piece, and the same technique is sometimes used to keep the hole entry neat.

Holes are easier to start in wood as the drill bit can be accurately positioned by pushing it into the wood and creating a dimple. The bit will thus have little tendency to wander.

=== Others ===
Some materials like plastics as well as other non-metals and some metals have a tendency to heat up enough to expand making the hole smaller than desired.

== Related processes ==
The following are some related processes that often accompany drilling:

Counterboring
This process creates a stepped hole in which a larger diameter follows a smaller diameter partially into a hole.
Countersinking
This process is similar to counterboring but the step in the hole is cone-shaped.
Boring
Boring precisely enlarges an already existing hole using a single point cutter.
Friction drilling
drilling holes using plastic deformation of the subject (under heat and pressure) instead of cutting it.
Reaming
Reaming is designed to enlarge the size of a hole to leave smooth sides.
Spot facing
This is similar to milling, it is used to provide a flat machine surface on the workpiece in a localized area

== See also ==
- Laser drilling
- Drilling rig
- Drill bit sizes
