= Dongmei Chen =

Chinese-American mechanical engineer

Dongmei "Maggie" Chen is a mechanical engineer and control theorist. She works at the University of Texas at Austin as a professor of mechanical engineering, holding a J. Mike Walker Professorship in Mechanical Engineering. Her research applies control theory to autonomous vehicles, small-scale energy systems, wind turbines, and drilling automation.

== Education and career ==
Chen received a bachelor's degree in Precision Instrument and Mechanology from Tsinghua University. She earned her Ph.D. in mechanical engineering, specializing in Dynamic Systems and Control, from the University of Michigan in 2006.

She was a Senior Control Algorithms Engineer in the automotive industry before joining the University of Texas as an assistant professor in 2009.

Chen is a Senior Editor of IEEE/ASME Transactions on Mechatronics, and an Associate Editor of ASME Journal of Dynamic Systems, Measurement, and Control. She served as the Chair of ASME Energy Systems Technical Committee, ASME Dynamic Systems and Control Division from 2016 to 2018.

== Recognition ==
Chen received NSF CAREER Award in 2011.

Chen was elected as an ASME Fellow in 2025.
