= Planing (shaping) =

Manufacturing process of material removal

Planing is a manufacturing process of material removal in which the workpiece reciprocates against a stationary cutting tool producing a plane or sculpted surface. Planing is analogous to shaping. The main difference between these two processes is that in shaping the tool reciprocates across the stationary workpiece. Planing motion is the opposite of shaping. Both planing and shaping are rapidly being replaced by milling.

The mechanism used for this process is known as a planer. The size of the planer is determined by the largest workpiece that can be machined on it. The cutting tools are usually carbide tipped or made of high speed steel and resemble those used in facing and turning.

== Process ==
In shaping, the tool is brought into position with the workpiece. The tool then repeatedly moves in a straight line while the workpiece is incrementally fed into the line of motion of the tool, this produces a flat, smooth, and sculpted surface. For shaped pieces the tool reciprocates across the stationary workpiece. The tools are usually tilted or lifted after each stroke. This is done hydraulically or manually in order to prevent the tool surface from chipping when the workpiece travels back across.

== Workpiece geometry ==
Planing can be used to produce flat surfaces, as well as cross-sections with grooves and notches, are produced along the length of workpiece. Shaping is basically the same as planing, except the workpiece is usually smaller, and it is the tool that moves and not the workpiece. Planing can be used to produce horizontal, vertical, or inclined flat surfaces on workpieces usually too large for shaping. Shaping is used not only for flat surfaces, but also for external or internal surfaces (either horizontal or inclined). Curved and irregular surfaces can also be produced by using special attachments

== Setup and equipment ==
Flat, angular, and contoured surfaces are made by horizontal shapers. Concerning shaping, the device that holds the piece being worked on has a very heavy movable jaw to withstand cutting forces. The size of the planer needed is determined by the workpiece. Depending on the size of the workpiece many clamps and supporting devices may be used to hold it on the planer.

== Typical tools and geometry produced ==
The tools for shaping/planing are usually made of high speed steel or carbide tipped. Except for some slight angle difference, cutting tools resemble those used in facing and turning. Some advantages of using single-point cutting tools over multipoint tools is that they are more easily sharpened and fabricated. Internal shapes can be made by using a special extension tool.

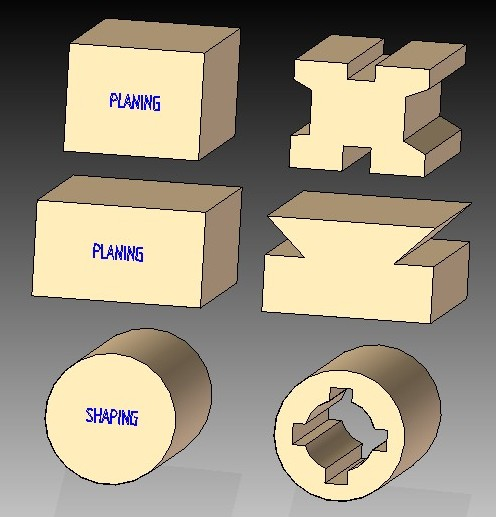
Before and after geometry

== Material properties ==
Although the most common material to be planed or shaped is wood, there are planers and shaping machines capable of processing anything from metal pieces to plastic objects.
