= Southbridge-Sargent Manufacturing District =

Historic district in Massachusetts, United States

- U.S. National Register of Historic Places
- U.S. Historic district
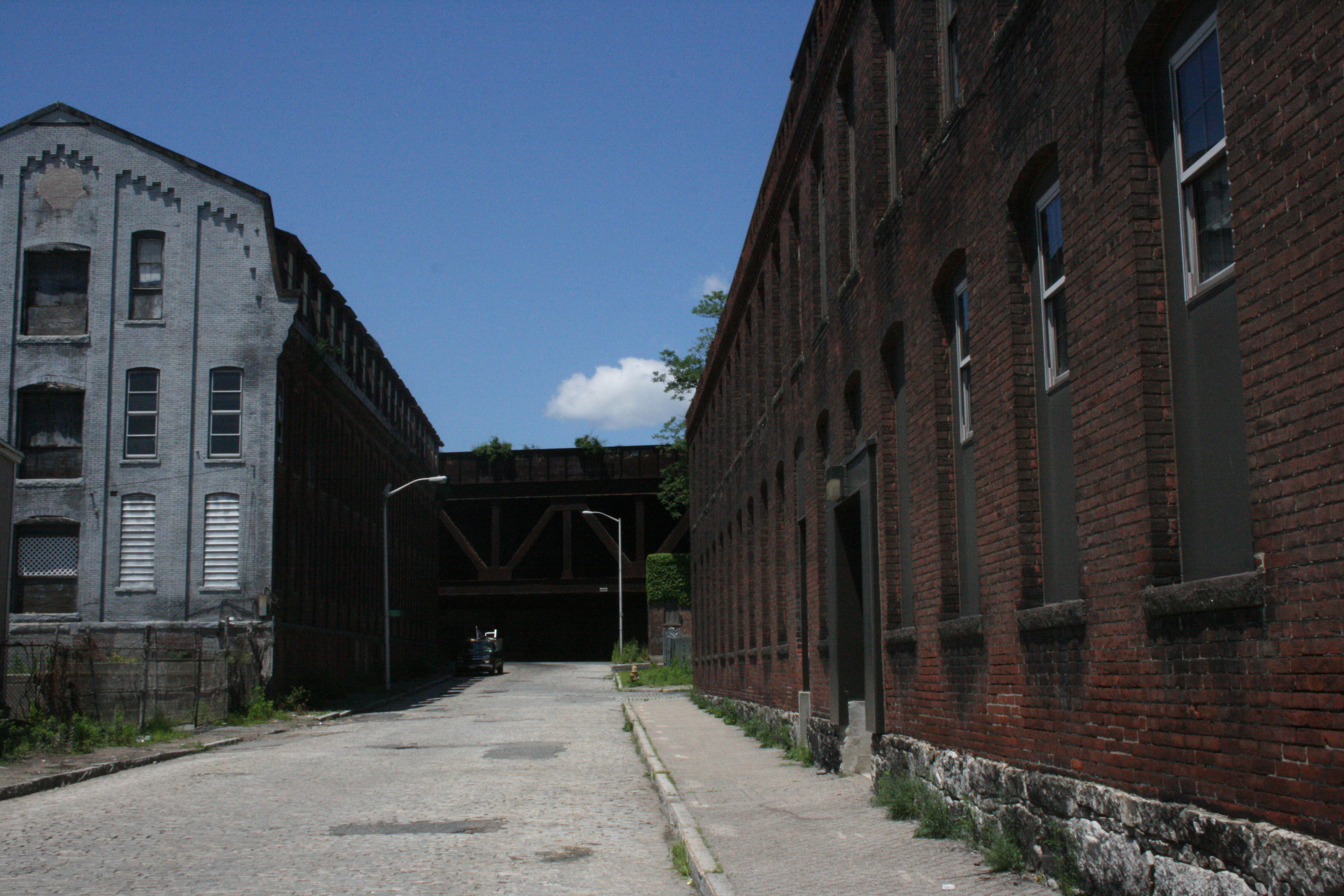

- Location within Massachusetts Location within the United States
- Location: Southbridge, Sargent, and Gold Sts., Worcester, Massachusetts
- Coordinates: 42°15′15″N 71°48′23″W
- Built: 1866
- Architectural style: Second Empire
- MPS: Worcester MRA
- NRHP reference No.: 80000534
- Added to NRHP: March 5, 1980

The Southbridge-Sargent Manufacturing District encompasses a collection of three 19th-century factory buildings near a historically important railroad junction in southern Worcester, Massachusetts. They were built near the intersection of Sargent and Gold Streets, just south of Southbridge Street. The location is close to a junction of three major railroads: the Boston and Albany, the Norwich and Worcester, and the New York, New Haven, and Hartford. The area was once a major industrial part of the city, but has lost many of its historic factory buildings in the 20th century.

The most significant building in the district is the former Sargent Card-Clothing Factory, 300 Southbridge Street. This Second Empire three story brick structure, built in 1866, is one of the oldest surviving factory buildings in the city. It was built for the Sargent brothers, leading manufacturers of card making machinery, and is built to a plan that was used, with some modifications, for later purpose-built factory buildings in the city.

The Rice and Griffin Factory at 5 Sargent Street was built c. 1890. It was originally three stories with a pitched gable roof, but the roof was removed and a fourth floor added. Rice and Griffin was founded in 1866, and was listed at that address from 1872 until 1905. The company's principal business was the production of architectural building parts, and it is probable that their products decorated a significant number of Worcester's Victorian houses.

The third factory, at 125 Gold Street, was built c. 1892 for the Whitcomb Manufacturing Company. It is a utilitarian two story brick building. The company began operations in space rented at 5 Sargent Street before building these premises. The company produced metalworking machinery, including planers, shearing and punching tools.

The district was listed on the National Register of Historic Places in 1980.

== See also ==
- National Register of Historic Places listings in southwestern Worcester, Massachusetts
- National Register of Historic Places listings in Worcester County, Massachusetts
