= Undercut (turning) =

Groove cut into a corner of a workpiece

In turning, an undercut is a recess in a diameter generally on the inside diameter of the part.

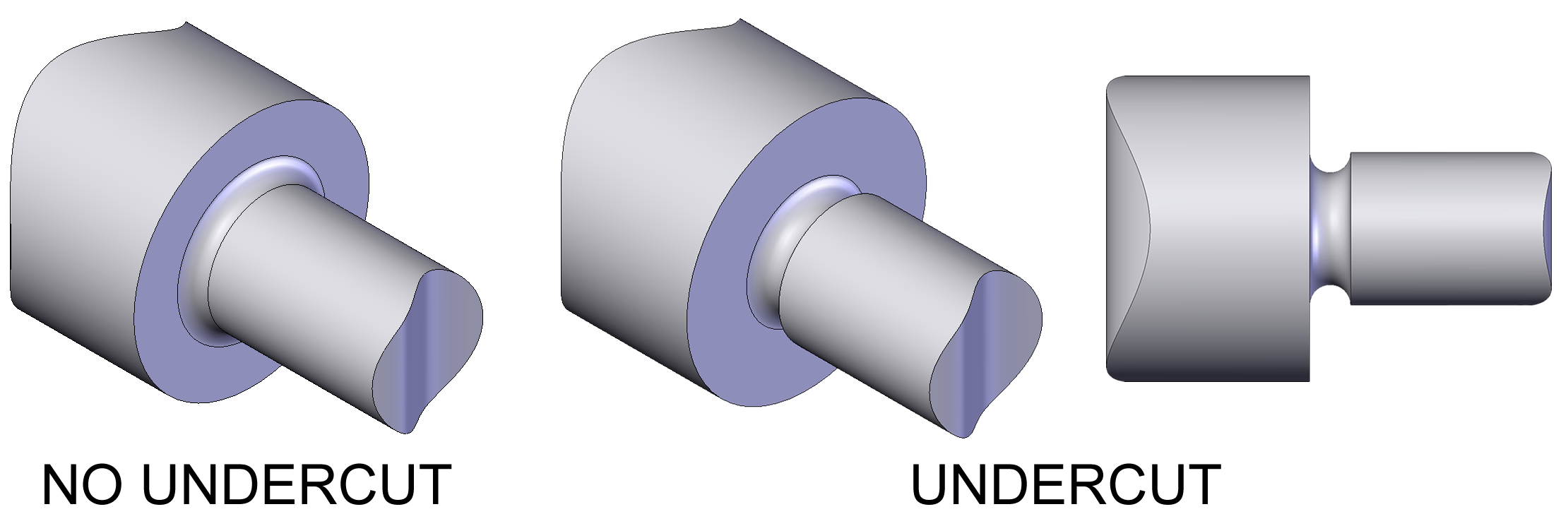
An example of a turned part with and without an undercut

On turned parts an undercut is also known as a neck or "relief groove". They are often used at the end of the threaded portion of a shaft or screw to provide clearance for the cutting tool, and also referred to as thread relief in this context. A rule of thumb is that the undercut should be at least 1.5 threads long and the diameter should be at least 0.015 in (0.38 mm) smaller than the minor diameter of the thread. For externally threaded products with metric thread, ISO 4755 provides recommended dimensions. Strictly speaking the relief simply needs to be equal or slightly smaller than the minor diameter of the thread. Thread relief can also be internal on a bore, and then the relief needs to be larger than the major thread diameter. They are also often used on shafts that have diameter changes so that a mating part can seat against the shoulder. If an undercut is not provided there is always a small radius left behind even if a sharp corner is intended. These types of undercuts are called out on technical drawings by saying the width and either the depth or the diameter of the bottom of the neck.
