= Rivet nut =

Kind of threaded insert

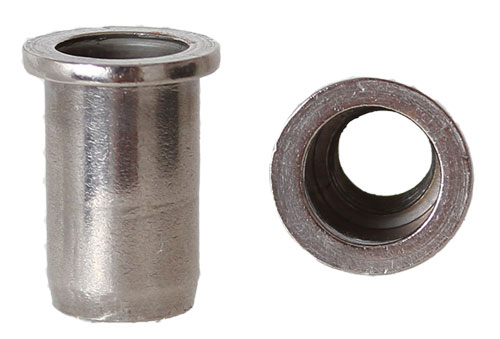
Typical rivet nut

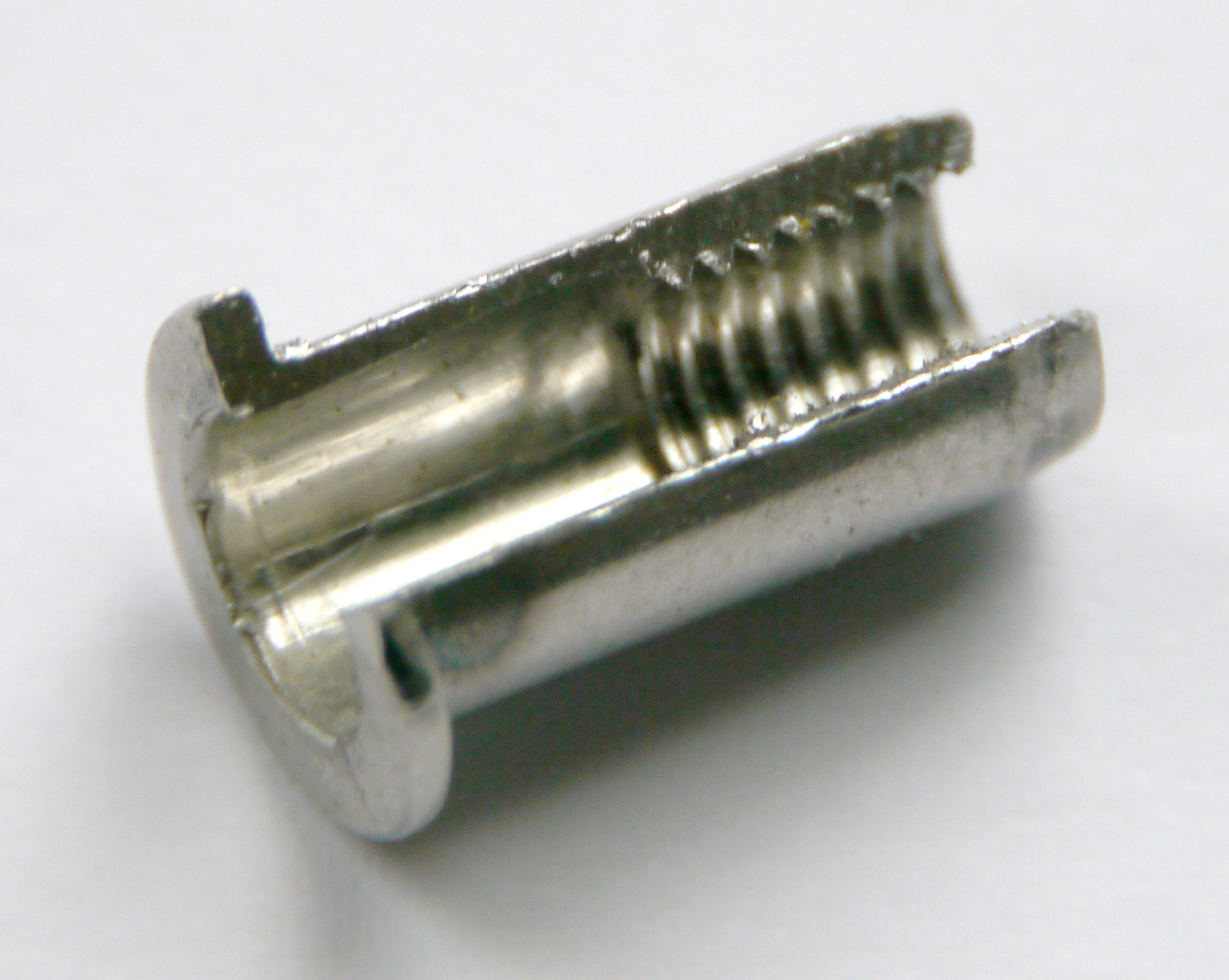
Sectional view

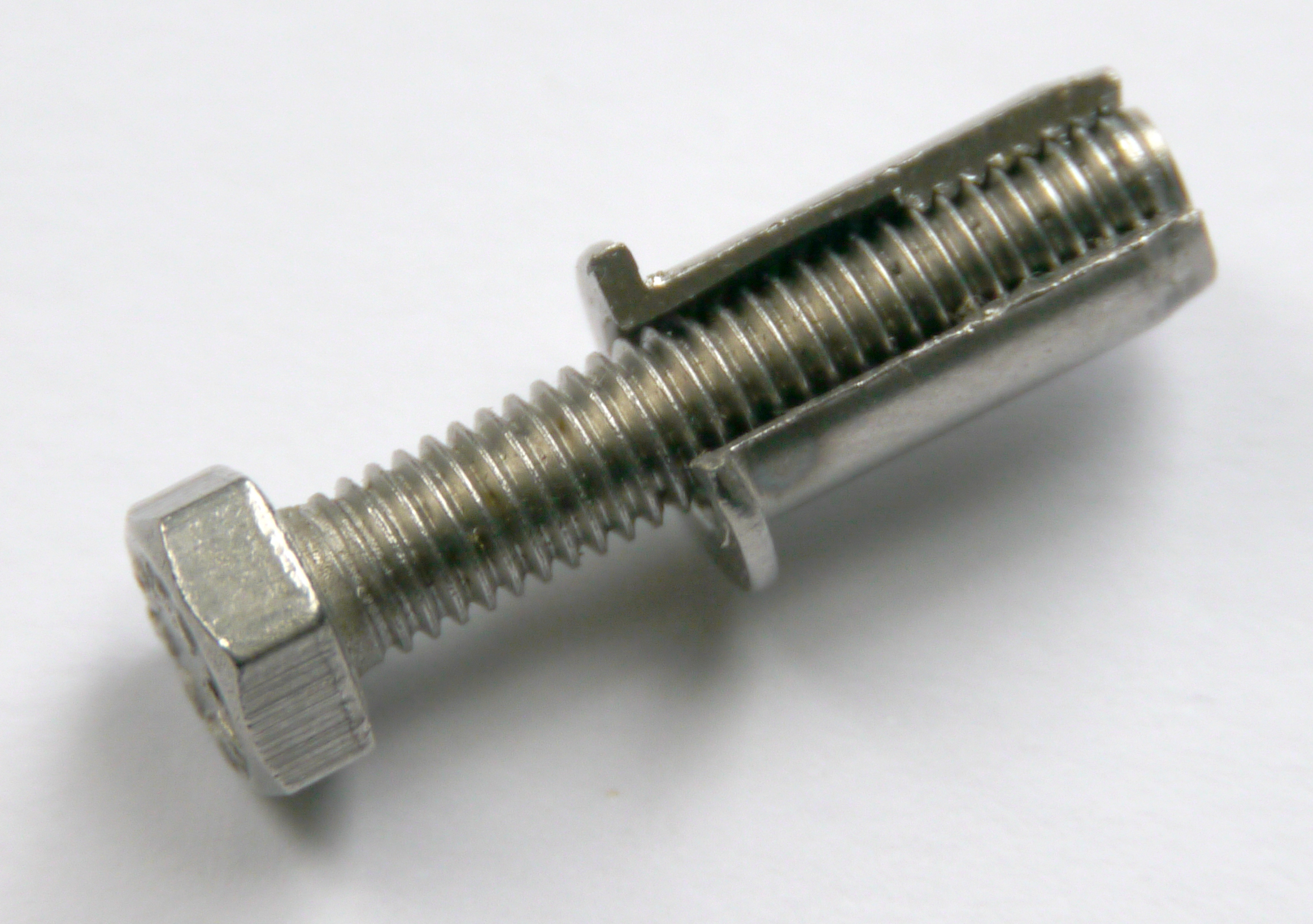
Sectional view, with bolt inserted

A rivet nut, also known as a blind rivet nut, rivnut, or nutsert is a one-piece internally threaded and counterbored tubular rivet that can be anchored entirely from one side. It is a kind of threaded insert. There are two types: one is designed to form a bulge on the back side of the panel as a screw is tightened in its threads. The other is similarly drawn in using a screw, but is drawn into the sleeve instead of creating a bulge.

== History ==
The first rivet nut was created by BF Goodrich in the 1930s, and sold under the trademark RIVNUT®. It was first used to mount rubber de-icing boots to aircraft wings.

== Usage ==
In the field of aviation, rivet nuts are often used to attach various items, such as static dischargers and inspection access covers, to the surface of an aircraft. Rivet nuts are an ideal replacement for weld nuts because they will not distort base materials, eliminate weld splatter, toxic fumes, and other by-products of the welding process, and can be installed in many different kinds of material including steel, plastic, composites, and fiberglass.

== See also ==
- Swage nut
- Friction drilling
