= Polygonal turning =

Machining process

Polygonal turning (or polygon turning) is a machining process which allows non-circular forms (polygons) to be machine turned without interrupting the rotation of the raw material.

== Technical details ==
Polygonally turned parts may have several points, teeth, or other forms at the ends or along their circumference. The technique requires synchronisation of the movement of the polygonal turning mill and the part being machined. Polygonal turning allows rapid production and clean machining of advanced geometries.

The polygon turning unit has a multitude of inserts, and is synchronized so that when an insert cuts the turning bar stock, it cuts the bar at the same radial position each time the workpiece rotates. This enables geometries such as hexes, squares and flats to be machined at faster speeds than by milling.

== Historical notes ==
The Polygonal Turning Corporation of Marquette, Michigan manufactured shaped joinery products for domestic use during the 1890s.

== See also ==
- Ornamental turning
