= Omega Technologies =

Omega Technologies is an American company that manufactures a proprietary line of aviation tools.

The company was founded in 1983 and is located in Westlake Village, California. Omega Technologies manufactures its own proprietary line of tools and also distributes product from other tool producers. Tooling products manufactured by Omega include fastener installation and removal tools, drills, countersinks, clamps, reamers and grinders.

The President of Omega Technologies is John Schoolland.
