= Friction drilling =

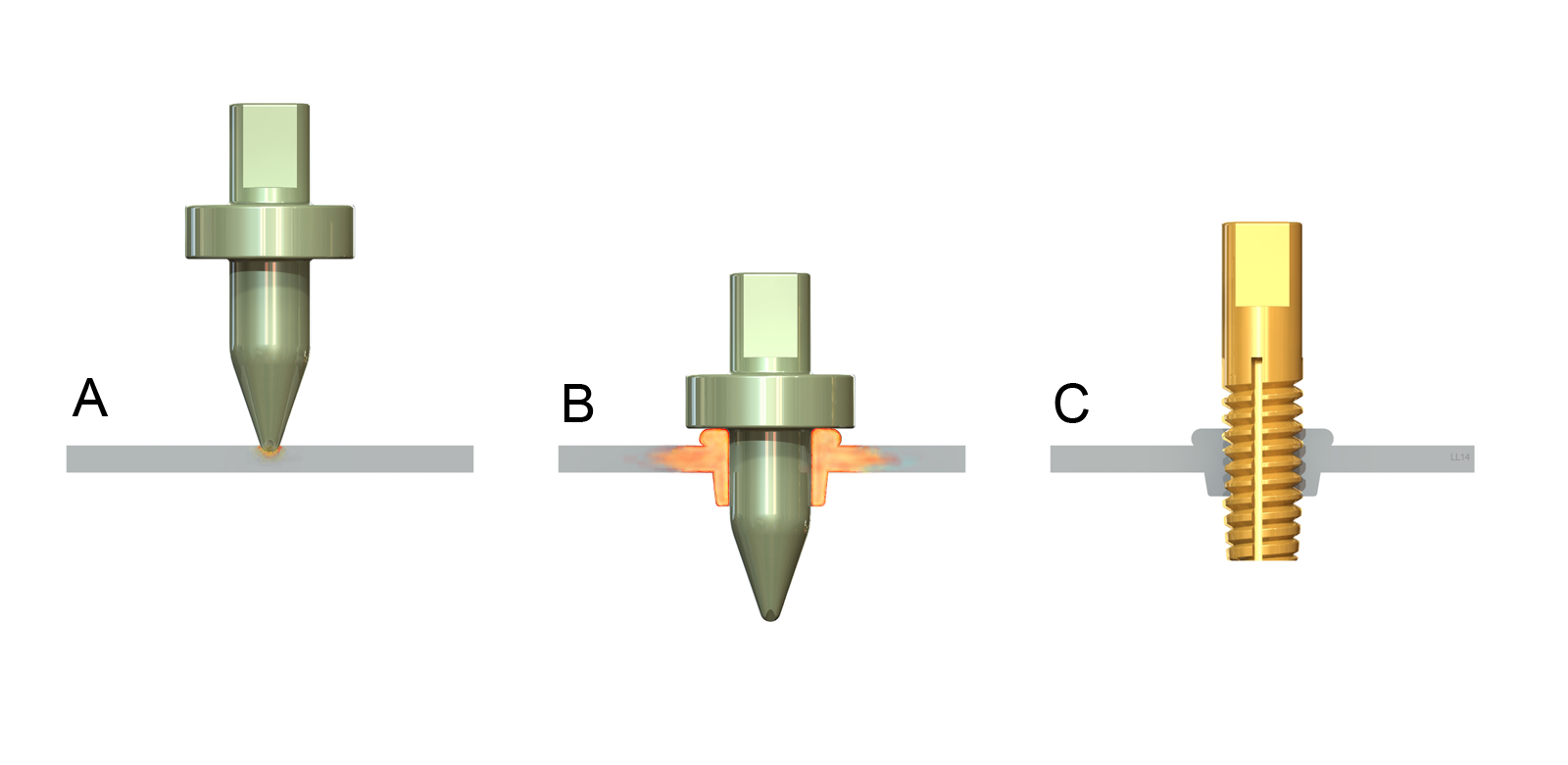
The basic steps in the friction drilling process: A. Applying pressure. B. Tool heats target and melts through it. C. Screw thread tapping.

Friction drilling is a method of making holes in metal in which the material is pushed out of the way with the aid of heat from friction. The process is also called thermal drilling, flow drilling, form drilling, or friction stir drilling.

Friction drilling is commonly used on bicycle frames, heat exchangers, and to create holes for mounting bearings.

== History ==
In 1923, the Frenchman Jean Claude de Valière tried making a tool that could make holes in metal by friction heat, instead of by machining. It was only a moderate success, because at that time the right materials were not yet available. Moreover, he hadn't yet discovered the right shape for this kind of tool.

It was not until the 1980s that a useful tool could be produced.

== Principle ==
Friction drilling uses a conical bit made of very heat-resistant material such as cemented carbide. This device is pressed against a target material with both high rotational speed and high pressure. That way, there is a high local production of heat which softens the object, making it plastic. The tool then "sinks" through the object, making a hole in it. Lubricants help prevent work-material from adhering to the bit. Unlike drilling, material that is flowed is not lost but it forms a sleeve around the hole. The length of that sleeve is up to 3 times the original thickness of the material. The presence of this metal lip around hole edges makes connections stronger.

Several options are available with this technology. Bits may include a cutting device that removes the typical "collar" of plastified material that flows upwards, so that an even top surface is the result. Drilled starter holes may be used to reduce the required axial force and to leave a smooth finish in the bushing’s lower edge. Internal screw threads may be cut with taps or rolled with dies.

== Advantages ==
- Very quick process (2 to 6 seconds)
- The process reshapes all material so that no material is lost. The excess material forms a sleeve that is about 3 times longer than the original thickness of the target material, which makes it possible to make very strong bolt joints in thin material.
- It is a clean process because no litter (particles) is produced.
- No access needed to back of workpiece, as with press-in or self-clinching hardware.
- More reliable and faster than rivet nuts (an alternative that also does not require access to back of workpiece).
- Works in almost all kinds of metal.

== Disadvantages ==
- Friction drilling is not possible in massive material since displaced metal must be able to flow somewhere. Maximum material thickness is typically half of the hole diameter with bit manufacturers providing specific guidance.
- The target material must be able to withstand the added heat. Materials that have been painted, plastic coated, galvanized, or heat treated are often unsuitable for this process.
- Requires higher motor capacity and rotational speed than conventional drills.
