= Swage nut =

Type of fastener

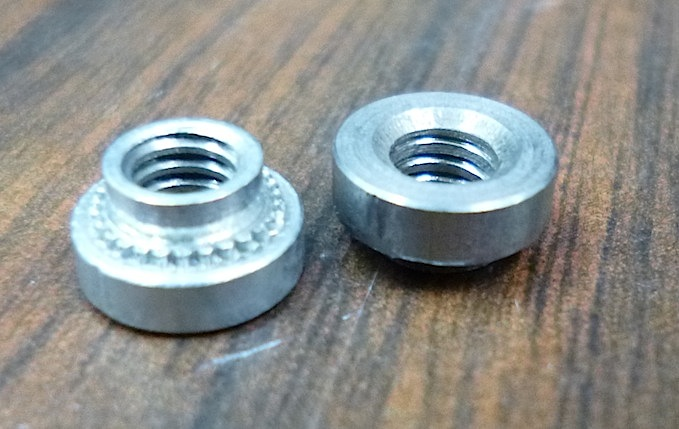
A pair of swage nuts threaded to accept 8-32 screws. Note the narrow undercut visible just above the clinching ring on the left-hand nut.

A swage nut or self-clinching nut is a type of nut or threaded insert that is used on sheet metal.

It permanently anchors itself to the sheet metal by swaging the surrounding material. Generally, the swage nut is made of a hard metal such as stainless steel, which is inserted into a pre-drilled hole in a softer ductile material such as aluminum. The inserted shank has three diameters: a main shaft which fits the hole closely, a thin smaller-diameter undercut, and a larger-diameter serrated clinching ring. Forcing the clinching ring into softer material, with an arbor press or by tightening a screw through the hole, causes it to plastically deform (swage) into the annular recess in the shank. This locks the nut into the hole. The knurling on the clinching ring is not necessary for this step, but prevents the nut from rotating after installation.

This is a popular method for adding strong, load-bearing threads to a relatively thin piece of sheet metal. Commercial varieties exist to suit common sheet metals, such as mild steel, stainless steel, and aluminum, and can include finishes for corrosion resistance.

Self-clinching nuts are described in National Aerospace Standard NASM45938 which supersedes military specification MIL-N-45938

== History ==
Albert Spokes filed for a U.S. patent on the swage nut in early 1958. The swage nut is descended from an older idea, the clinch nut. Clinch nuts incorporate a tubular shaft that fits through the part to be attached and is clinched or riveted in place from the opposite side.

== See also ==
- Rivet nut
- Friction drilling
