= Facing (machining) =

Cutting of a flat surface perpendicular to the axis of the miller or lathe

In machining, facing is the cutting of a flat surface perpendicular to some axis of the workpiece. This can be applied in two different areas:

- Facing on a milling machine (perpendicular to the axis of movement), which involves various milling operations, but primarily face milling.
- Facing on a lathe (perpendicular to the axis of rotation), which is commonly used in turning and boring operations.

Other operations remove material in ways similar to facing, for example, planing, shaping, and grinding, but these processes are not labeled by the term "facing."

== Facing lathe operation ==
Facing on the lathe uses a facing tool to cut a flat surface perpendicular to the work piece's rotational axis. A facing tool is mounted into a tool holder that rests on the carriage of the lathe. The tool will then feed perpendicularly across the part's rotational axis as it spins in the jaws of the chuck. A user will have the option to hand feed the machine while facing, or use the power feed option. For a smoother surface, using the power feed option is optimal due to a constant feed rate. Facing will take the work piece down to its finished length very accurately. Depending on how much material needs to be taken off, a machinist can choose to take roughing or finishing cuts. Factors that affect the quality and effectiveness of facing operations on the lathe are speeds and feeds, material hardness, cutter size, and how the part is being clamped down.

== Face milling operation ==
Facing on a milling machine is the process of cutting a flat surface perpendicular to the axes of the milling cutter. This process removes the material by rotating the facing tool in the counterclockwise direction as the table feeds the work piece across the cutter. Face milling can be achieved with an end mill, but is often done with a face mill, shell mill or a fly cutter. Face milling can be done in both manual machining and CNC machining. To obtain a smoother surface finish it is best to let the machine feed the table. Newer manual milling machines and CNC machines will have this option, but older milling machines will not. Hand feeding the table will allow human error into the process. Machinists also have the option to take roughing cuts and finish cuts. Factors that affect the quality and effectiveness of facing operations on the mill are speeds and feeds, material hardness, cutter size, and how the part is being clamped down.

Spotfacing is the facing of spots (localized areas), such as the bearing surfaces on which bolt heads or washers will sit.
