= Spotface =

Localized flat region on a machined workpiece

Spotfacer is marked F. Similar to an endmill but with flat-bottom plunging ability. The tool at E, a counterbore, is also often used for spotfacing in manual machining (not so much in CNC machining).

A spotface or spot face is a machined feature in which a certain region of the workpiece (a spot) is faced, providing a smooth, flat, accurately located surface. This is especially relevant on workpieces cast or forged, where the spotface's smooth, flat, accurately located surface stands in distinction to the surrounding surface whose roughness, flatness, and location are subject to wider tolerances and thus not assured with a machining level of precision.

The most common application of spotfacing (spot facing) is facing the area around a bolt hole where the bolt's head will sit, which is often done by cutting a shallow counterbore, just deep enough "to clean up"—that is, only enough material is removed to get down past any irregularity and thus make the surface flat. Other common applications of spotfacing involve facing a pad onto a boss, creating planar surfaces in known locations that can orient a casting or forging into position in the assembly; allow part marking such as stamping or nameplate riveting; or offer machine-finish visual appeal in spots, without the need for finishing all over (FAO).

The cutters most often used to cut spotfaces are counterbore cutters and endmills. In manual machining especially, the former is useful because its pilot guides the cutter into the correct location (established by the bolt hole), and its cutting lips are perpendicular to the hole axis with no relief angle, meaning that a plunging cut, moving in only the Z-axis, will leave a flat surface. In contrast, most general-purpose endmills have a relief angle such that a plunging cut (Z-axis-only toolpath) will leave a very slightly convex surface. But in CNC machining this is irrelevant, because the flat spotface is left by circular interpolation of the endmill as it traces a circular toolpath in the XY plane. Zero-angle cutters obviate this, functioning similarly to the traditional counterbore cutters of manual machining but needing no pilot. Spot facing of larger planar surfaces sometimes employs face mills.

Backspotfacing (back spot facing) is analogous to backboring, meaning that the tool manages to reach to the far side of the workpiece (away from the spindle side) and cut back toward the spindle. Such operations can be done with boring bars reaching through a hole while shifted off-center, then shifting onto center for the cut (for example, in the G76 fine boring cycle), or with back-deburring style tools whose cutting edges open and close in umbrella-like or check-valve-like fashion. Such back-cutting operations can obviate second operations, with their attendant setup time and part rehandling time. Sometimes the limiting factor in applying this advantage is the difficulty of chip clearance; the operator needs to intervene because chip nests prevent the tool from passing freely and opening and closing freely. In such cases, improved chipbreaking via different inserts in the main operation may help, and backspotfacing tools powered by coolant pressure and using through-tool coolant feed may succeed where others cannot (opening, cutting, and retracting despite some chips), not only obviating a second operation but also making the main operation less reliant on operator intervention and program stops (M00 or M01) than a lesser backspotfacing tool would.

Some fastener designs can obviate spotfacing for some applications. For example, a self-aligning nut allows the nut to find its own perpendicularity to the thread axis by floating via a pair of spherical bearing surfaces (a ball-in-cup arrangement).

Standards exist for the sizes of spotfaces, especially for fastener head seating areas. These standards can vary between corporations and between standards organizations. For example, in Boeing Design Manual BDM-1327 section 3.5, the nominal diameter of the spot-faced surface is the same as the nominal size of the cutter, and is equal to the flat seat diameter plus twice the fillet radius. This is in contrast to the ASME Y14.5-2009 definition of a spotface, which is equal to the flat seat diameter.

== See also ==
- Counterbore
- Countersink
