= Turning =

Machining process

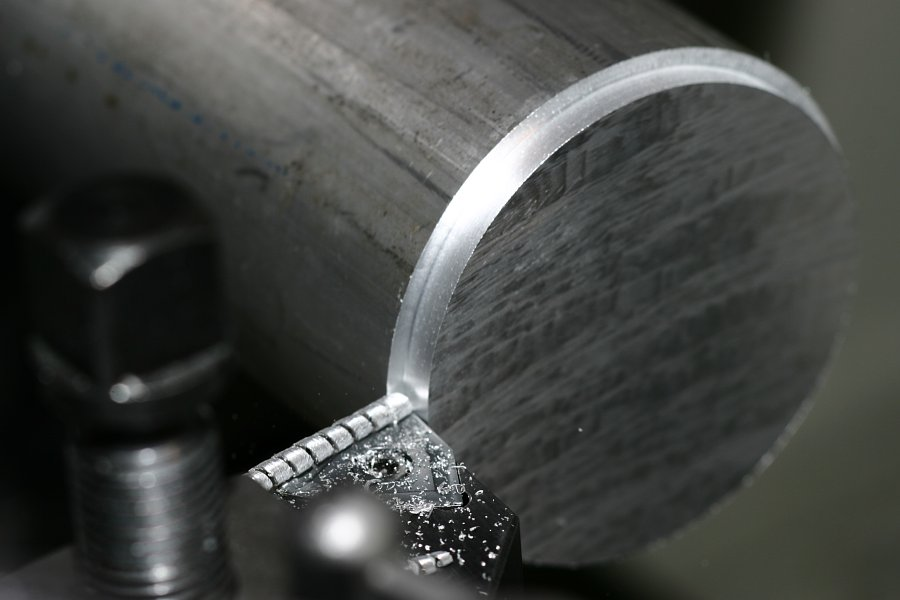
Roughing, or rough turning

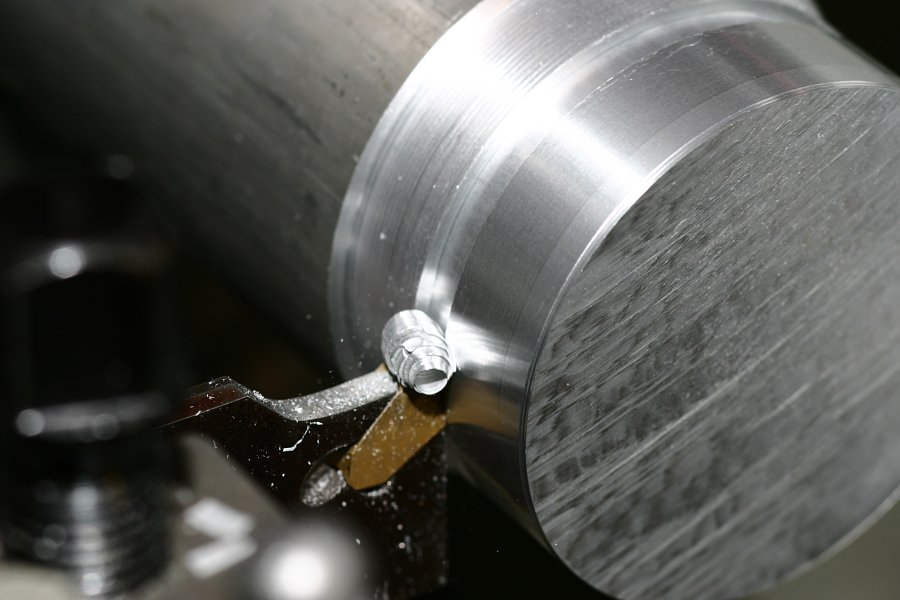
Parting aluminium

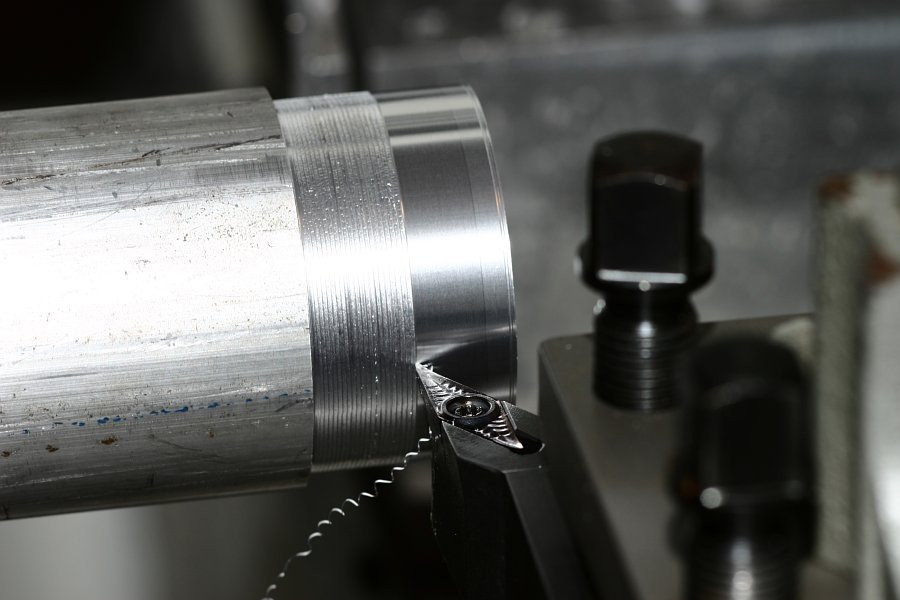
Finish turning

Turning is a machining process in which a cutting tool is held nearly stationary to cut a rotating workpiece. The cutting tool can be slowly moved back-and-forth and in-and-out to cut cylindrical shapes and flat surfaces on the workpiece. Turning is usually done with a lathe.

Usually the term "turning" is used for cutting external surfaces, and "boring" for internal surfaces, or holes. Thus the phrase "turning and boring" categorizes the larger family of processes known as lathing. Additionally, "facing" is cutting the ends of the workpiece, to create flat faces.

Turning is typically done with either a manual or computer numerical control (CNC) lathe. With a manual lathe, an operator turns cranks to move the cutting tool. On a CNC lathe, the cutting tool is moved by a computer, controlling electric motors to follow a pre-programmed path. Early manual lathes could be used to produce complex geometric figures, even the platonic solids, though this is now usually done with CNC machines.

Different turning processes are typically carried out on a lathe, such as straight turning, taper turning, profiling or external grooving. Those types of turning processes can produce various shapes of materials such as straight, conical, curved, or grooved workpieces. In general, turning uses simple single-point cutting tools.

The waste metal cut off the workpiece from turning operations are known as chips in North America, or swarf in Britain. In some areas they may be known as turnings.

A component that is made by turning is often called a turned part.

== Turning operations ==
Turning

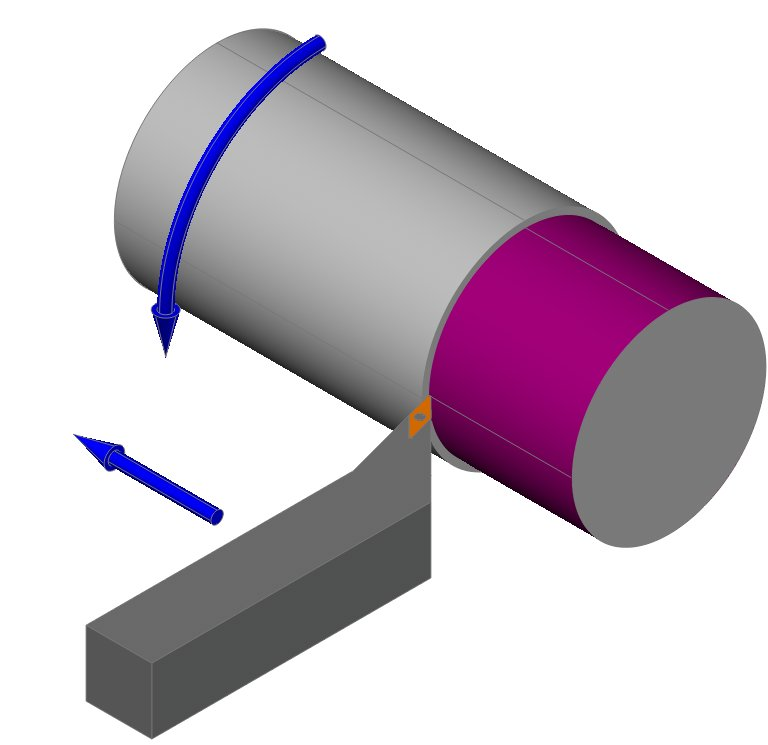
Turning

The general process of turning involves rotating a workpiece while a single-point cutting tool is moved parallel to the axis of rotation. Turning can be done on the external surface of the part as well as the internal surface (the process known as boring). The starting material is generally a workpiece generated by other processes such as casting, forging, extrusion, or drawing.

Tapered turning
Tapered turning produces a cylindrical shape that gradually decreases in diameter from one end to the other.

Spherical generation
Spherical generation produces a spherical finished surface by turning a form around a fixed axis of revolution.

Hard turning
Hard turning is performed on workpieces with a hardness greater than 45 Rockwell C. It is typically performed after the workpiece is heat treated. It is generally better than grinding for rough stock removal. However, grinding generally produces a better surface finish and can produce parts with greater dimensional accuracy.

Boring
Cutting the inside surface of a hole or tube. A hole is usually first created by drilling, and then it is bored to enlarge it to its final diameter.

Drilling
Removes material from the inside of a workpiece with a drill bit. This process is the reverse of normal drilling operations in that the drill bit is held stationary and the workpiece is rotated. Reamers can also be used to enlarge a hole after it has been drilled.

Facing

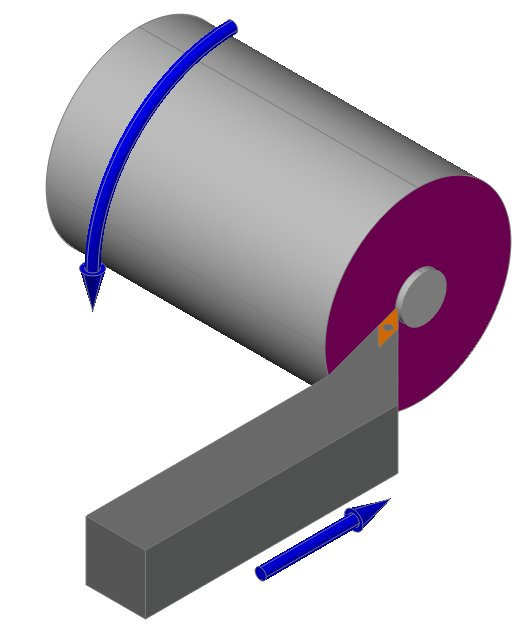
Facing

Facing removes material from the end of a workpiece by moving the cutting tool perpendicular to the workpiece's axis of rotation.

Grooving

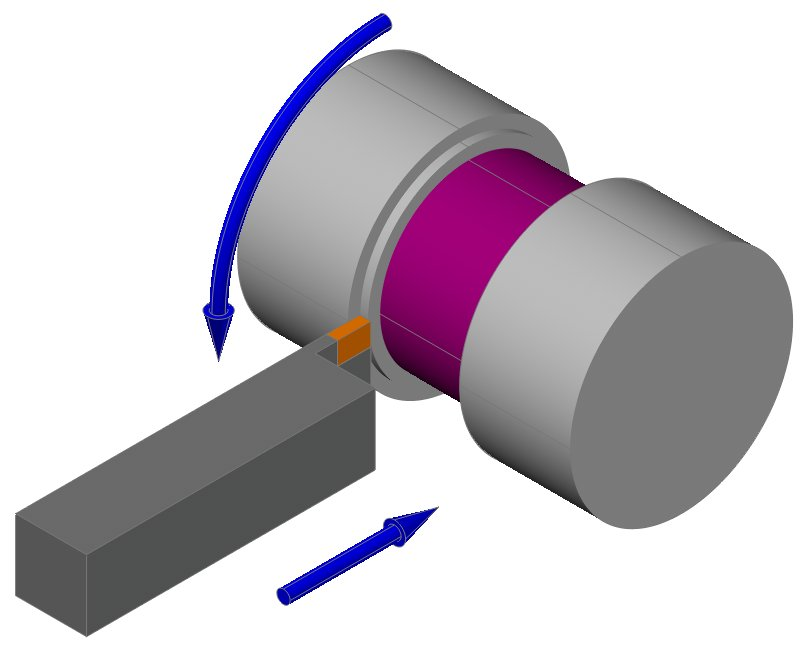
External grooving

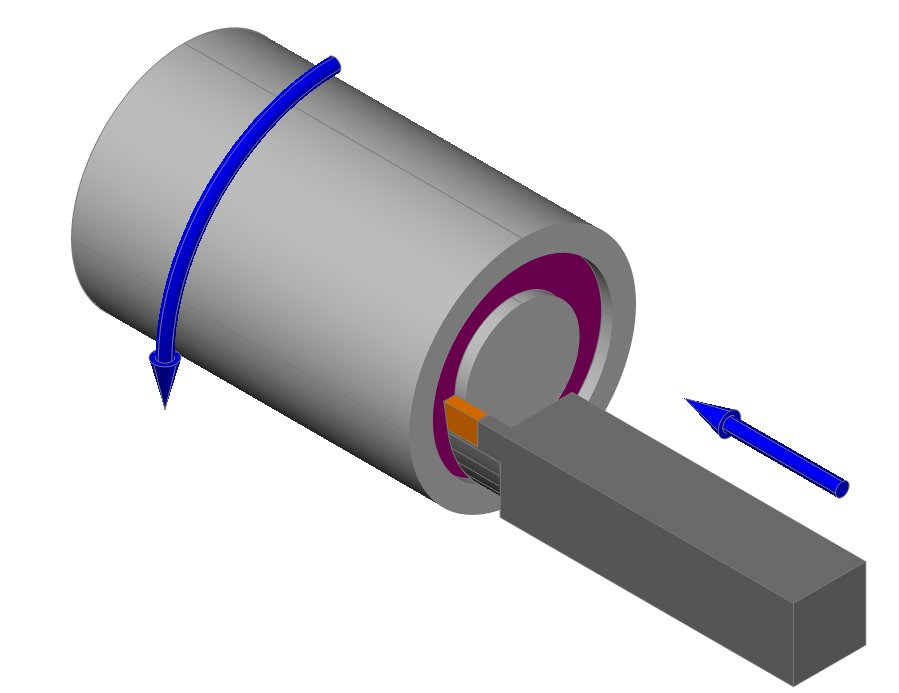
Face grooving

Grooving is the cutting of grooves to a specific depth in the workpiece. It can be performed on either internal or external surfaces, as well as on the face of the part. This is called "face grooving" or "trepanning."

Parting
"Parting off" or "cutoff" is performed by creating a deep groove, all the way through the workpiece, until the end falls off.

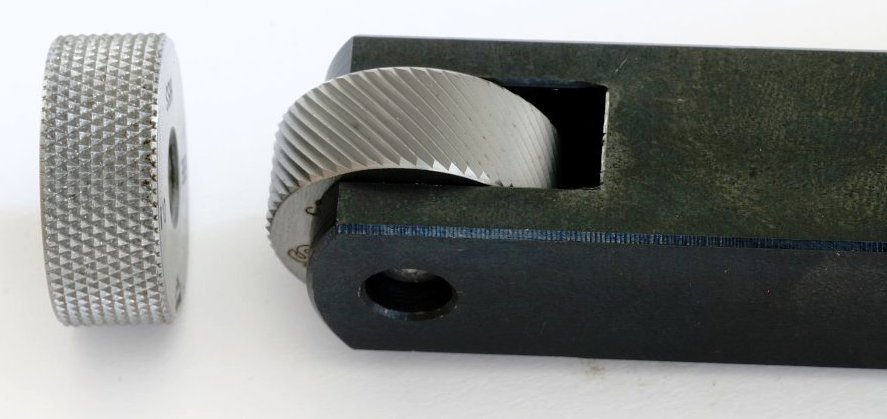
Knurling

Knurling
Pressing a serrated pattern onto the surface of a part to use as a hand grip or as a visual enhancement using a special purpose knurling tool.

Threading
Screw threads can be turned on a lathe using a cutting tool with the shape of the thread. The axial movement of the cutting tool is linked to the rotation of the workpiece to create the thread's pitch. When this is performed on an outer surface, similar to turning, external threads are created. When performed on an internal surface, similar to boring, internal threads are created. This is referred to as "single point threading."
Alternately, taps and dies can be used to cut internal and external threads, respectively.

Polygonal turning
Non-circular forms are machined.

== Lathes ==
Turning is usually performed on a lathe, which range in size from tabletop machines suitable for jewelry, to building-sized machines for manufacturing ship propeller shafts.

=== Workholding methods ===
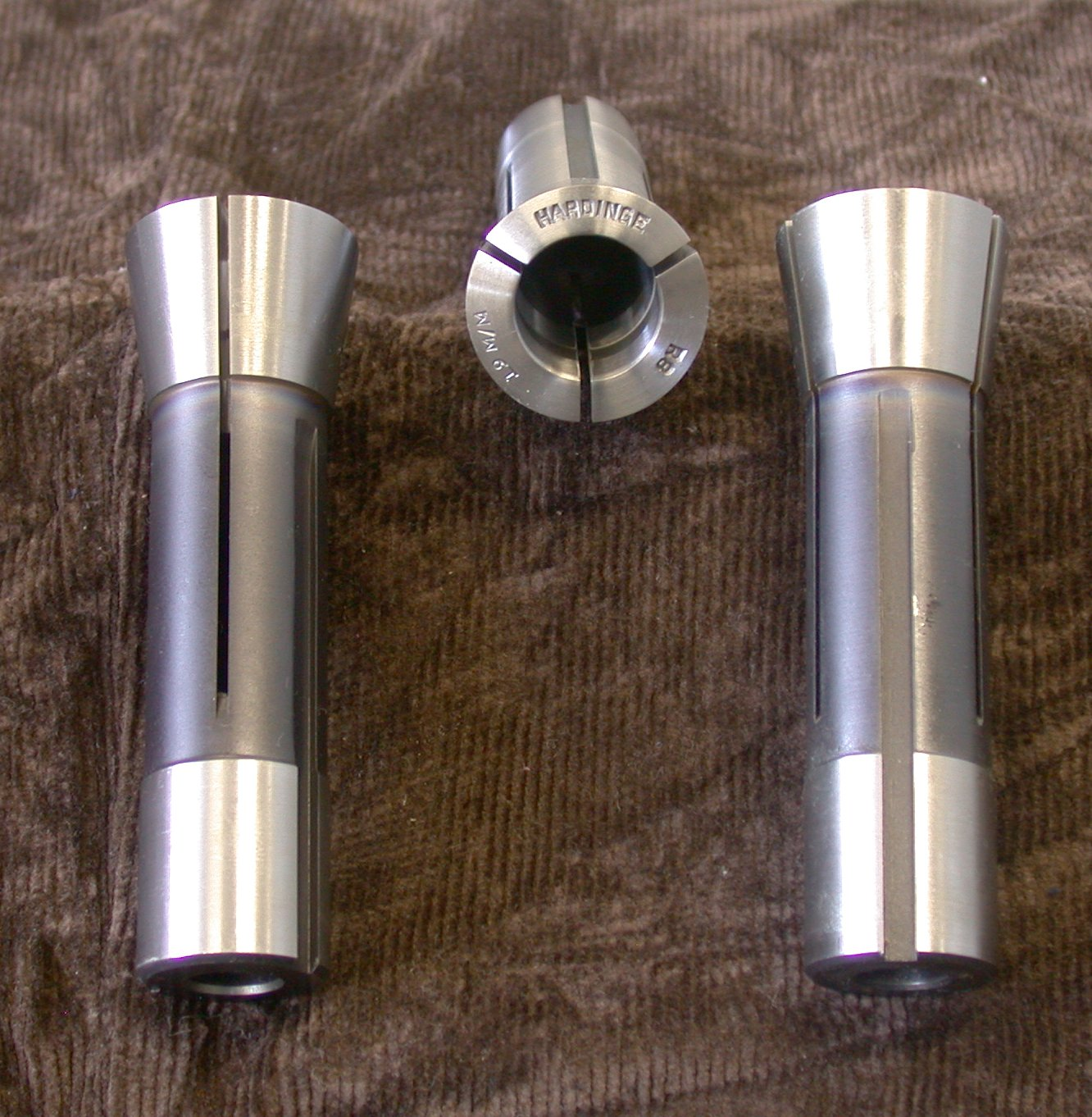
Collets

Chuck
Chucks grip a workpiece with movable jaws. They are less accurate than collets, but can hold a wider range of workpiece sizes.
Collet
Collets grip a workpiece by deforming around it. They grip over a larger surface than chucks, which puts less pressure on the workpiece, and center the workpiece better. Each collet has only a narrow range of workpiece diameters that it can deform enough to hold, so large sets of different collets are needed.
Faceplate
A faceplate is a plate that a workpiece is attached to, often with clamps or t-slot nuts. It is often used with a drive dog and mandrel. It can hold even more irregularly shaped workpieces than a chuck.
Centers
Centers are pointed cones, which support either a hollow tube workpiece, or a workpiece with holes drilled in its ends. Workpieces are ofter driven by a "dog".
Drive center
A drive center is a center which grips the workpiece strongly enough to drive it without the use of a dog. They often use hydraulic or spring-loaded teeth that bite into the end of workpieces. When supporting a workpiece only with centers, the entire outside of the workpiece may be machined in one setup.

== Tooling ==
Turning tooling usually cuts with a single point, as opposed to a drill bit or end mill which cut with several sharp edges. The angles around the sharp point are important, such as rake angle, side rake angle, cutting-edge angle, and relief angle. Additionally, the cutting point may have a nose radius which creates radii when cutting corners in the workpiece and extends the life of the tool tip, but increases machining forces.

The tool bit is held with a rigid tool holder during operation. CNC machines are typically able to switch tools automatically.

== Dynamics of turning ==
=== Forces ===
Significant forces are required for turning operation, and must be accounted for in the design and selection of the machine tools, the workpiece holding, and any additional supports. A setup that is not strong enough may allow the workpiece to break free during operation, ruining the part being made, and endangering the operator. A setup that is not rigid enough will deform during operation, and create chatter when cutting, creating an undesirable surface finish, and inaccurate dimensions.

There are three principal forces in turning:

- The cutting or tangential force acts downward on the tool tip and upwards on the workpiece upward. This is the force required to cut chips off the workpiece. The force required to cut the material is called the specific cutting force, and depends on the material, cut depth, cut speed, and lubrication.
- The axial or feed force acts in the longitudinal, or feed direction. This is the force necessary to feed the tool along the rotational axis of the workpiece.
- The radial or thrust force acts in the radial direction and tends to push the tool out of the workpiece.

=== Speeds and feeds ===
Speeds and feeds refer to the rotational speed that the workpiece is rotated at, and the feed speed that the tool is moved at. They are chosen based on the workpiece material, cutter material, setup rigidity, machine tool rigidity, spindle power, and whether coolant is used.

The rotational speed is measured in revolutions per minute (rpm).

The feed rate is the distance that the tool is fed into the workpiece per workpiece revolution. It is measured either as millimeters per revolution (mm/rev), or as inches per revolution (in/rev).

== See also ==
- Diamond turning
- Engine turning
- Surface feet per minute
- Woodturning
