= Workpiece =

Piece being processed into another shape

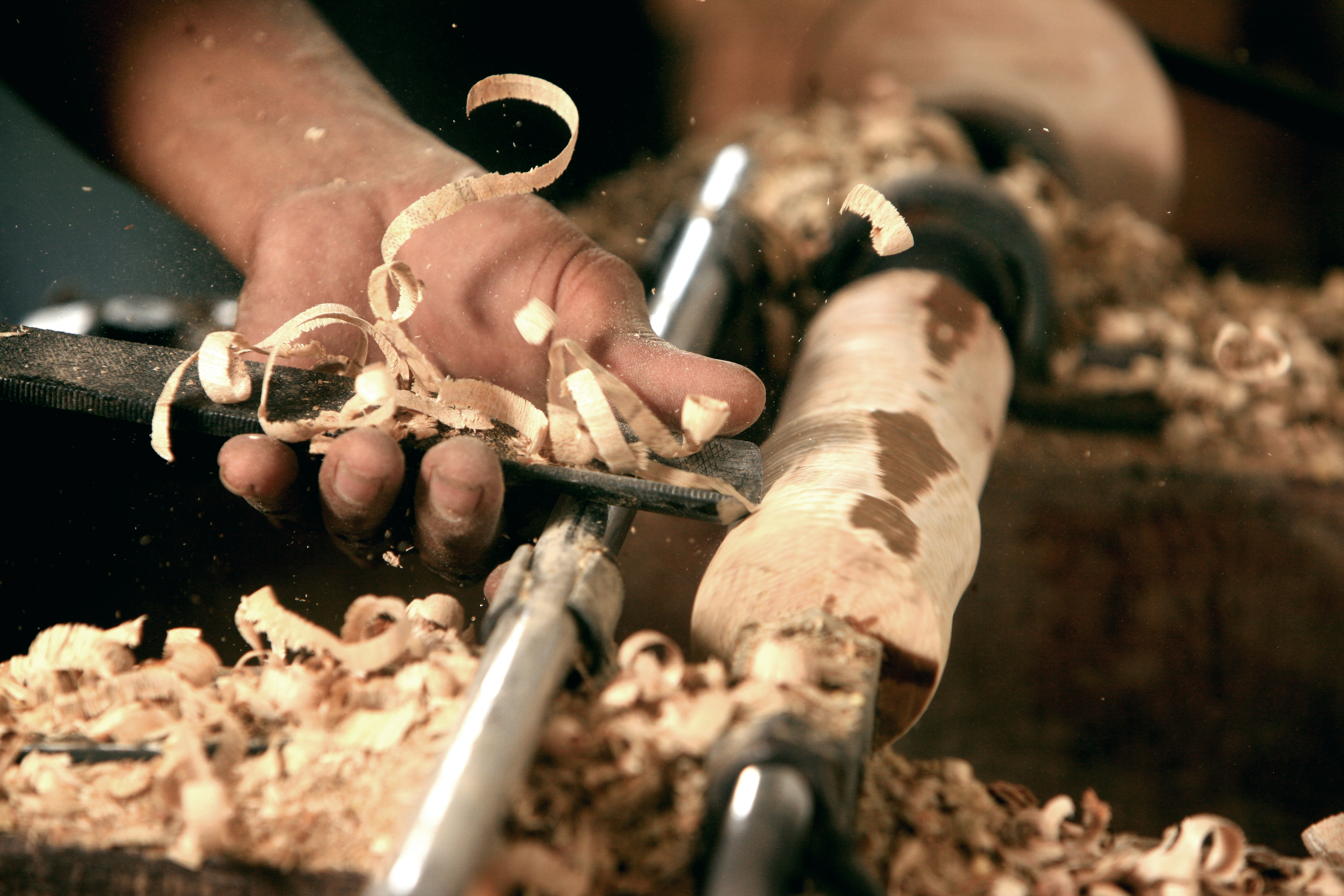
Turning of a workpiece of wood.

A workpiece is a piece, often made of a single material, that is being processed into another desired shape (such as building blocks).

The workpiece is usually a piece of relatively rigid material such as wood, metal, plastic, or stone. After a processing step, the workpiece may be moved on to further steps of processing. For example, a part can made out of bar stock and later become part of a semi-finished product.

The workpiece is often attached to the tool being used via a jig or fixture, like for example to a milling machine via an angle plate, or to a lathe via a lathe faceplate. A vise is another example of a simple type of fixture used to fix workpieces.

A workpiece may be subjected to various cutting operations, like truing, making fillets, chamfers, countersinking, counterboring, etc. It may also receive various surface treatments and finishes.

The term "workpiece" has established itself within crafts and the manufacturing industry, and connects the work or treatment and the object to be treated.

A workbench is often used to hold a workpiece steady during work on it.

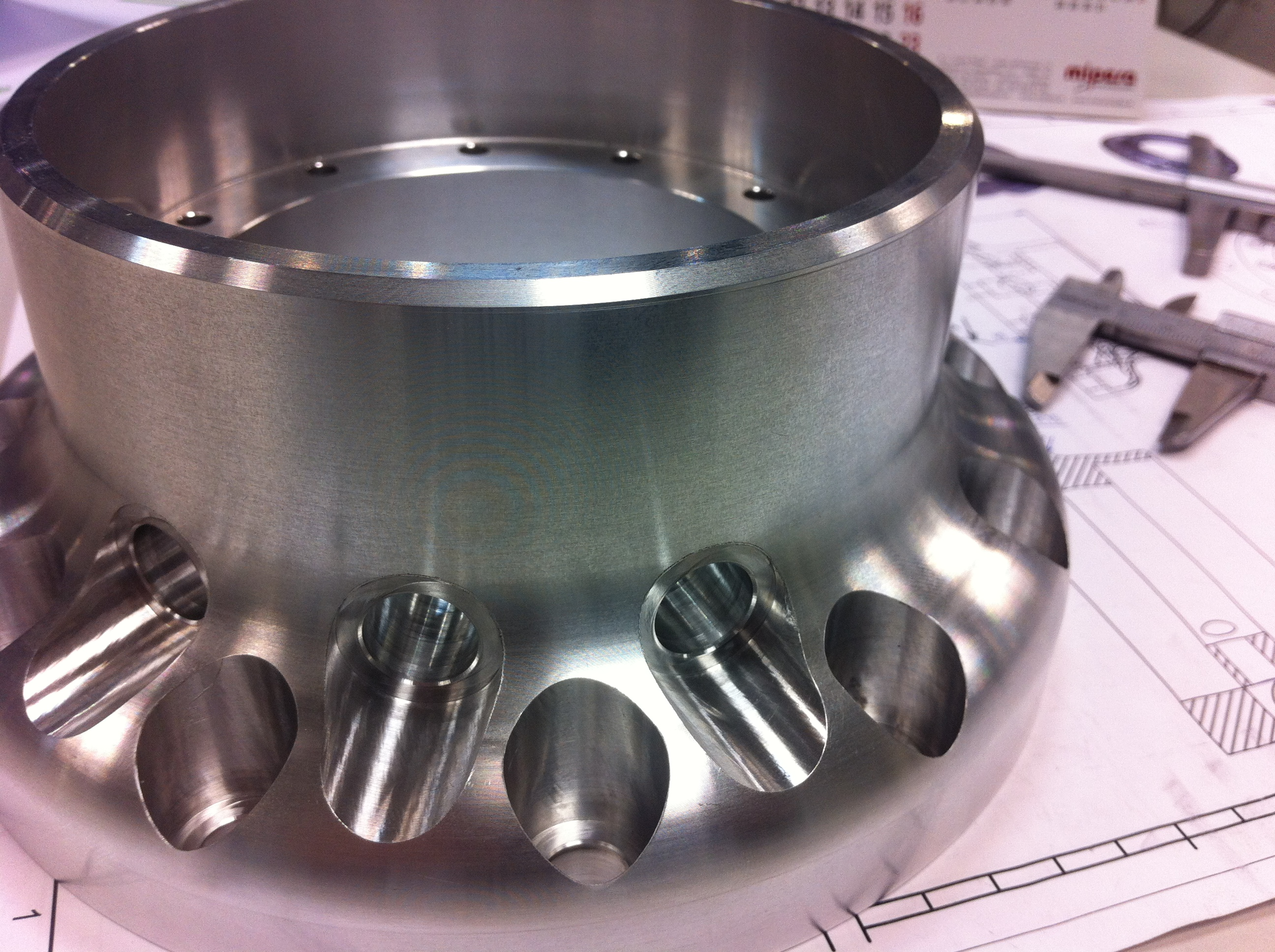
A mechanical workpiece made of steel

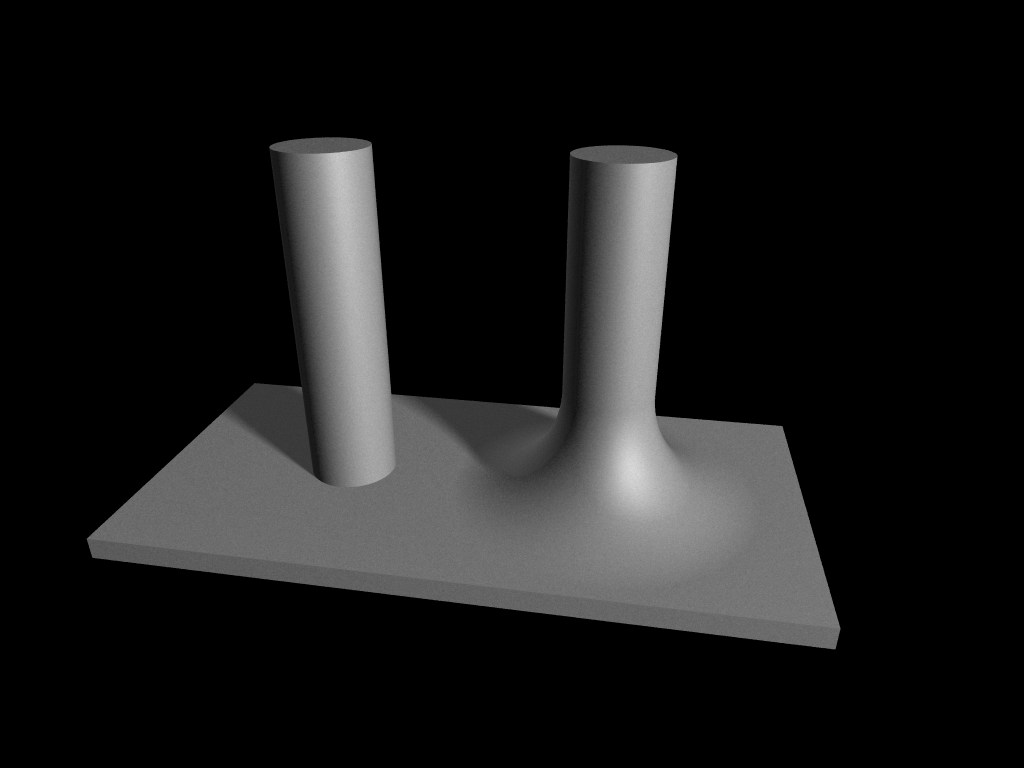
A workpiece with a filleted pole (right) and non-filleted pole (left)

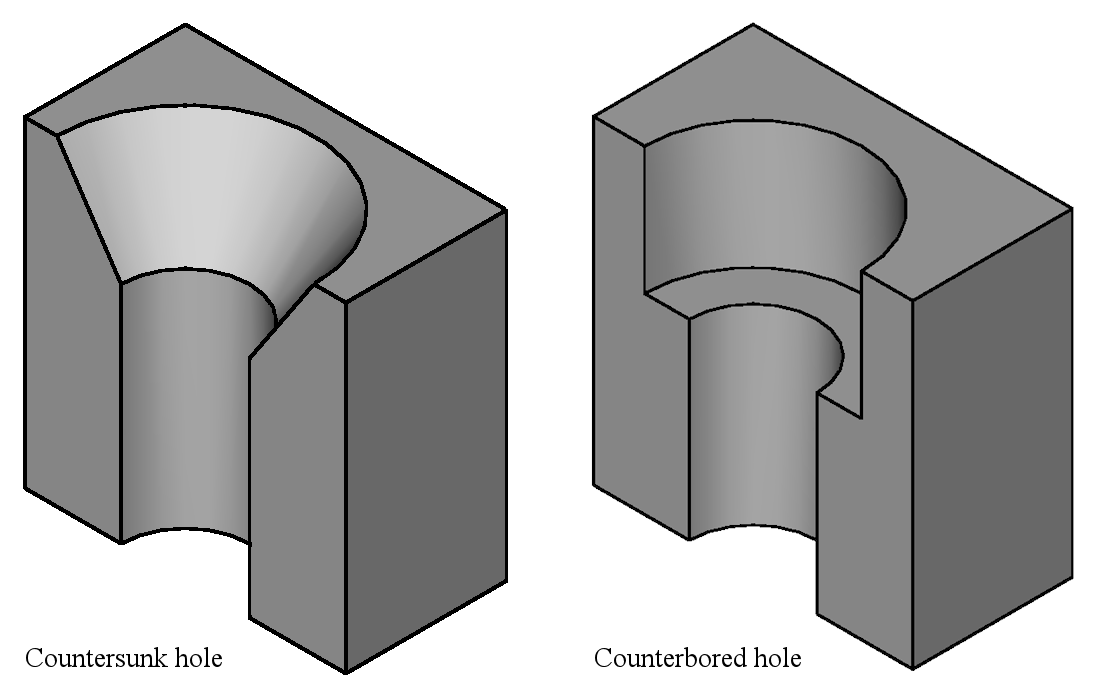
A workpiece with a countersunk hole (left) and a workpiece with a counterbored hole (right)

== See also ==
- Surface finishing
- Metalworking
