= Countersink =

Conical hole cut so a fastener can be inserted flush with the surface

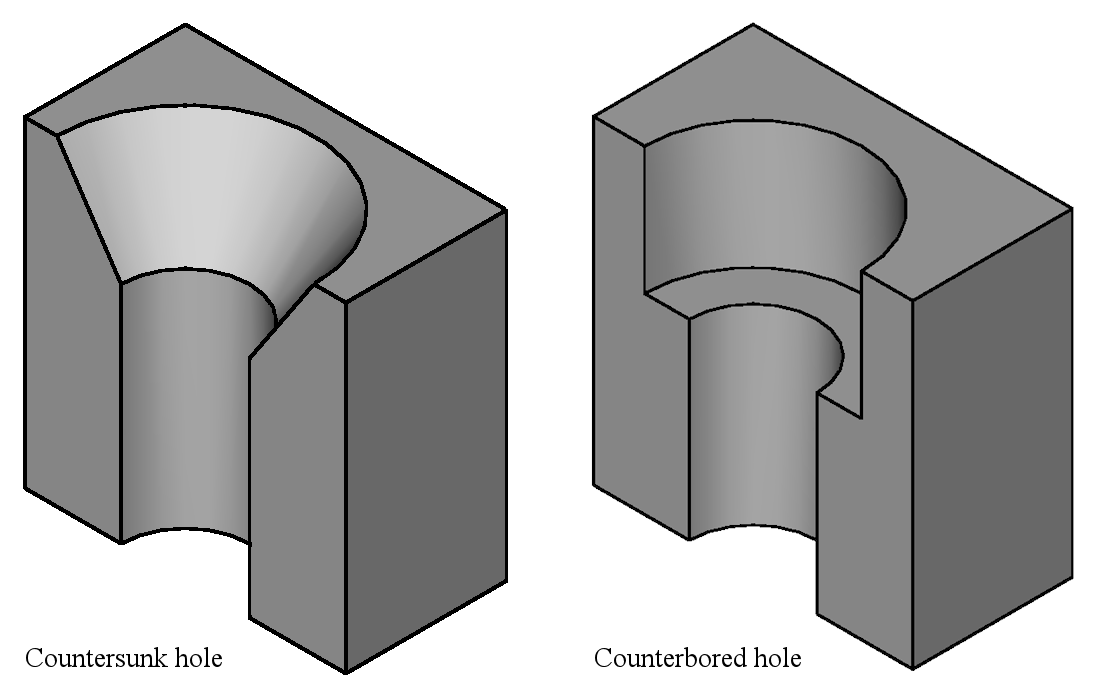
Comparison of countersunk and counterbored holes.

In manufacturing, a countersink (symbol: ⌵) is a conical hole cut into a manufactured object, or the cutter used to cut such a hole. A common use is to allow the head of a countersunk bolt, screw or rivet, when placed in the hole, to sit flush with or below the surface of the surrounding material (by comparison, a counterbore makes a flat-bottomed hole that might be used with a socket-head capscrew). A countersink may also be used to remove the burr left from a drilling or tapping operation, thereby improving the finish of the product and removing any hazardous sharp edges.

The basic geometry of a countersink (cutter) inherently can be applied to the plunging applications described above (axial feed only) and also to other milling applications (sideways traversal). Therefore, countersinks overlap in form, function, and sometimes name with chamfering endmills (endmills with angled tips). Regardless of the name given to the cutter, the surface being generated may be a conical chamfer (plunging applications) or a beveled corner for the intersection of two planes (traversing applications).

== Types ==
Normal countersunk angle	Type of thread
60°	
82°	American inch screws (UNC, UNF, UNS)
90°	ISO metric
100°	British imperial inch screws (BA, BSF, BSW, etc.), Unified National (i.e. inch size) Aviation fasteners
110°	
120°	

=== Machining ===
A countersink may be used in many tools, such as drills, drill presses, milling machines, and lathes.

==== Cross-hole countersink cutter ====
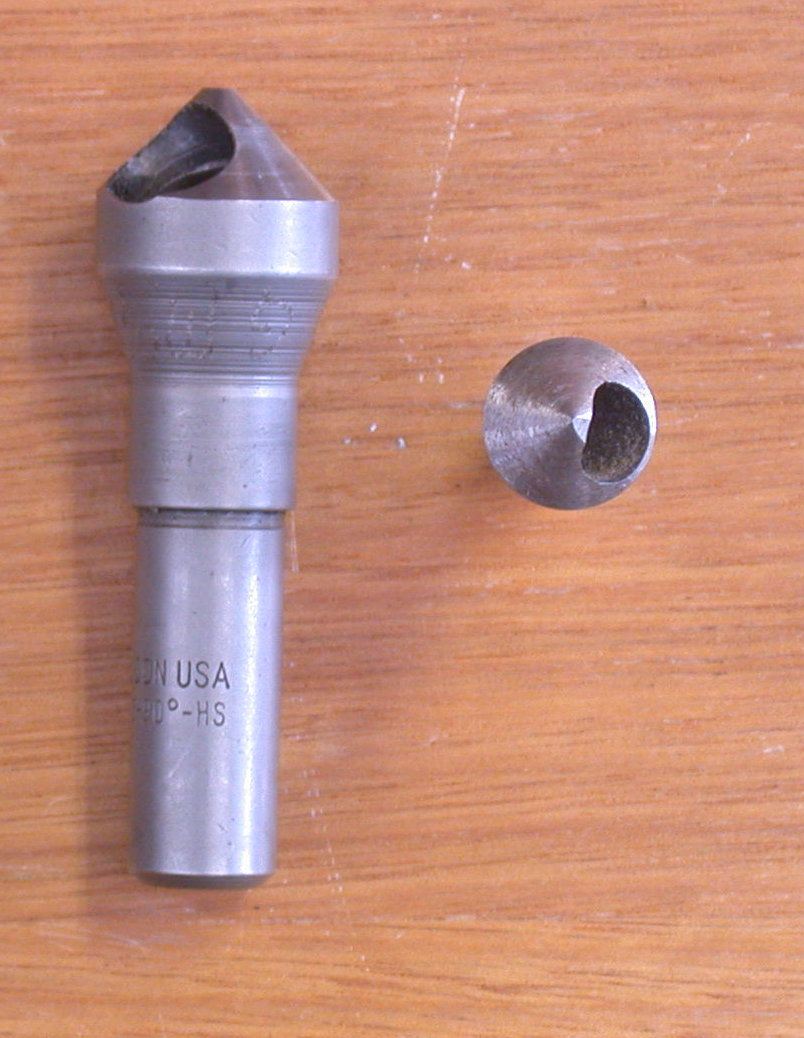
Side and end view of a Weldon style "zero flute" countersink

A cross-hole, "Weldon style" or "zero flute" countersink is a cone-shaped tool with a cutting edge provided by a hole that goes through the side of the cone. The intersection of the hole and cone form the cutting edge on the tool. The cone is not truly symmetrical as it is essential that the cone retreats away from the cutting edge as the tool rotates providing clearance. If this does not occur the cutting edge will lack clearance and rub rather than bite into the material. This clearance is referred to as cutting relief.

These tools are best used as deburring tools, where the burr from a previous machining operation needs to be removed for cosmetic and safety reasons, however they may be used in softer materials (such as wood or plastic) to create a countersunk hole for a screw.

==== Fluted countersink cutter ====
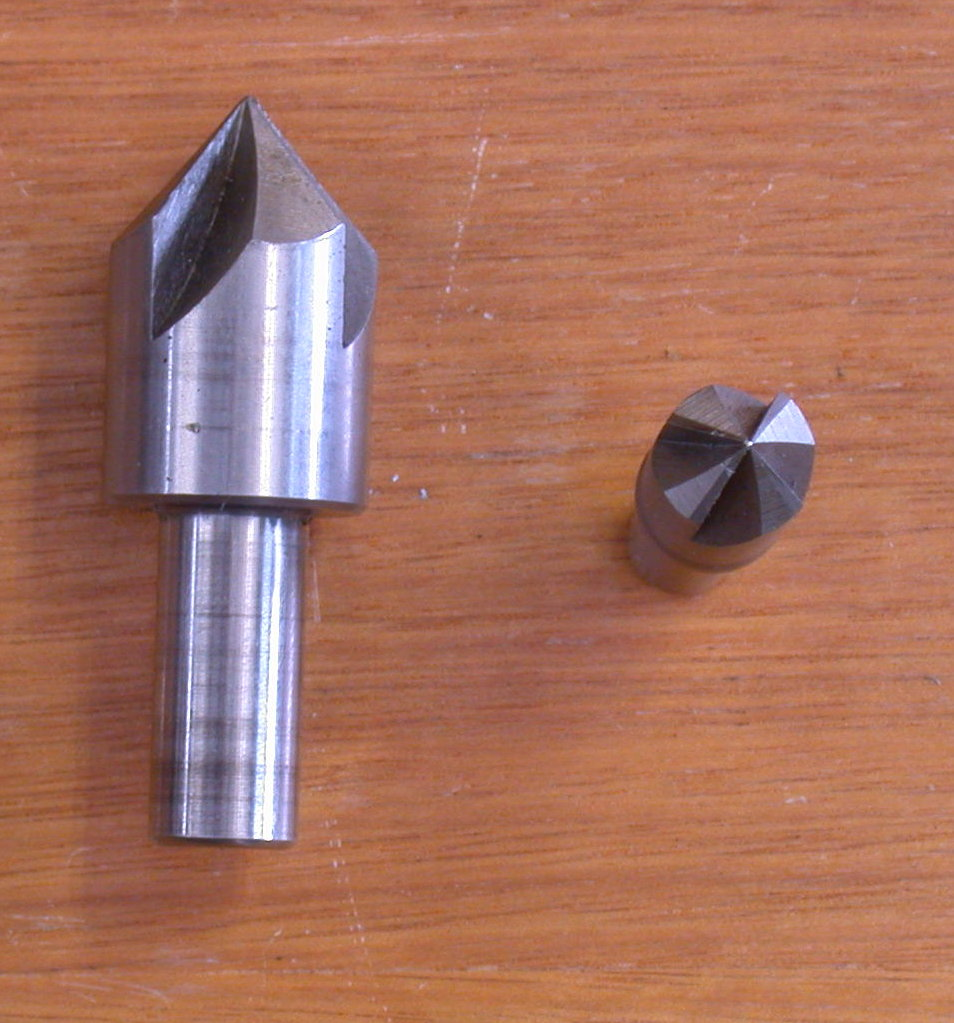
Side and end view of a 4-fluted countersink

The fluted countersink cutter is used to provide a heavy chamfer in the entrance to a drilled hole. This may be required to allow the correct seating for a countersunk-head screw or to provide the lead in for a second machining operation such as tapping. Countersink cutters are manufactured with six common angles, which are 60°, 82°, 90°, 100°, 110°, or 120°, with the two most common of those being 82° and 90°. Countersunk-head screws that follow the Unified Thread Standard very often have an 82° angle, and screws that follow the ISO standard very often have a 90° angle. Throughout the aerospace industry, countersunk fasteners typically have an angle of 100°.

==== Back countersink ====
A back countersink, also known as an inserted countersink, is a two-piece countersink used on tough to reach areas. One component is a rod that is inserted into the existing hole in the workpieces; the other component is the cutter, which is attached to the rod, or extends out of it, after it is in position. This is comparable to other types of "back-" machining, such as back-spotfacing, back-boring, back-counterboring, back-milling, and back-deburring. The common theme is accomplishing machining operations on the far side of the workpiece from the spindle face, which obviates a "second operation" setup. This reduces setup time and frustration in several ways. Not only does it obviate the flipping over, cleaning, reclamping, etc., but it also can allow effortless high concentricity, parallelism, and squareness with the first setup's datum without the hassle of reestablishing it on another setup (via painstaking indicating).

==== Speeds, feeds, and avoiding chatter ====
It can often be difficult to avoid chatter when cutting with countersink cutters. As usual in machining, the shorter and more rigid the setup, the better. Better-quality fluted countersink cutters sometimes have the flutes (or at least one flute) at an irregular pitching. This variation in pitching reduces the chance of the cutting edges setting up a harmonic action and leaving an undulated surface. This surface ripple is also dependent on the surface speed of the cutting edges, material type, and applied pressure (or feed rate); once started it is hard to remove. Too light a feed tends to increase chatter risk. As in many other machining operations, an appropriate response to the chatter may be to decrease speed and increase feed. On a drill press, the slowest available spindle speed is usually best. With a variable-speed handheld power drill, the trigger is best squeezed lightly to yield a low spindle speed.

Good chatter-free results can usually be had by countersinking by hand (as opposed to running the tool in a powered spindle). The slow speed and sensitive feed tend to prevent chatter. With a quarter-inch-hex shank, the countersink cutter can be held with a screwdriver handle of the indexable-bit type.

=== Form countersinking ===
Form countersinking, also known as dimpling, is a countersink that is formed into sheet metal to increase the strength of a structure as the countersinks of multiple pieces nest together. There are two processes for producing formed countersinks: coin dimpling and modified radius dimpling. Such dimples in fairly thick sheet can even be tapped to yield a threaded hardpoint on the sheet without the bother and expense of welding a nut to the sheet. This style of construction is often seen in modern household appliance design, because it allows the product to be lower-priced, and the quality can still be good as long as the sheet is thick enough.

== See also ==
- Counterbore
- Speeds and feeds
- Spotface
