= Safety wire =

Locking device for bolts etc.

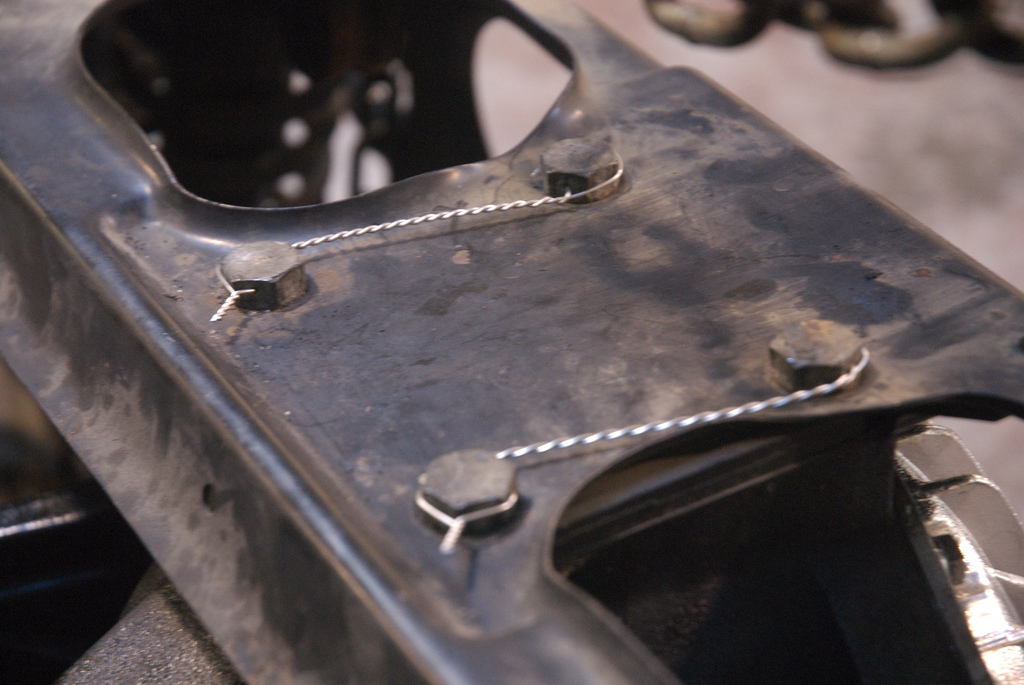
Safety wiring of two pairs of drilled bolt-heads wired one-to-the-other

A safety wire or locking-wire is a type of positive locking device that prevents fasteners from loosening due to vibration and other forces. The presence of safety wiring may also serve to indicate that the fasteners have been properly tightened.

Safety wire is available in a variety of gauges and materials, depending on the application. In aircraft and racing applications, stainless steel wire is used, such as in 0.8 mm (0.032 in) diameter. Typically, the wire is threaded through a hole drilled into a fastener or part, then twisted and anchored to a second fastener or part, then twisted again.

== Application ==
=== Principle ===
There are a few techniques for different applications. The word safetying is universally used in the aircraft industry. Briefly, safetying is defined as: "Securing by various means any nut, bolt, turnbuckle etc., on the aircraft so that vibration will not cause it to loosen during operation." These practices are not a means of obtaining or maintaining torque, but rather a safety device to prevent the disengagement of screws, nuts, bolts, snap rings, oil caps, drain cocks, valves, and parts. The wire itself maintains tension and remains in place by being twisted around itself and attached to the fastener to be secured on one end and an anchor point (which could be another fastener) on the other end. Since safety wire is made of a malleable alloy, it retains its shape after being bent, rather than springing back to its original shape. This property allows it to remain locked around an object, such as when it is passed through a small hole on a fastener, looped back upon itself and then twisted. The same process is then repeated around the anchor point, which could be another fastener. Since it remains twisted instead of unraveling, it acts as a fixed loop and will not back out without considerable force (greater than the stresses which it is intended to counter) being applied.

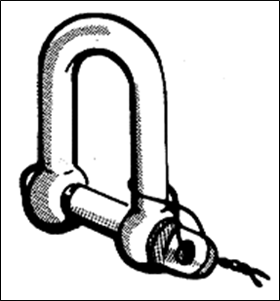
A moused shackle

Mousing (pronounced /ˈmaʊzɪŋ/) is the application of a molly or safety wire, called mousing wire in this use, to secure a threaded clevis pin to a shackle. This is done by passing a couple of turns of mousing wire through the reach-hole provided for this purpose in the unthreaded end of the clevis pin and around the body of the shackle's hoop. Alternatively, some threaded shackles are provided with a hole through the threaded end of the pin beyond where it emerges from the threaded hole. A cotter pin or a couple of loops of mousing wire through this hole serves the same purpose and secures the shackle in a closed position. Nylon zip-ties are also commonly used in applications where the shackle must be secured but easy removal is required.

=== Use ===
A safety wire is used to ensure proper security for a fastener. The wire needed is long enough to reach from a fixed location to a hole in the removable fastener, such as a pin — a clevis fastener, sometimes a linchpin or hitch-pin through a clevis yoke for instance — and the wire pulled back upon itself, parallel to its other end, then twisted, a single end inserted through a fastener, and twisted again, possibly then anchored to a second fastener or other part, then twisted once again, having excess slack pulled relatively taut to be secure. The two ends of the wire-loop thus formed are joined by twisting them together with a tool, using enough twists to be secure, then released from the twisting tool. The removable fastener — possibly a nut, wing nut, turnbuckle, a bolt or a pin similar to a bolt — having a hole through a part of it that will remain accessible when it is fastened in place will be secured with the wire passing through it. When finished, any excess length of wire would be cut off with a pair of wire cutters, such as pliers that may, also, be the twisting tool. If the fastener part to be secured does not come with a hole for the safety wire, one may need to be drilled.

Safety wire is not reusable, thus it can be cut apart in order to remove it easily when the fastener is to be opened.

=== Proper techniques ===
When using a most common gauge of safety wire, which is 0.8 mm (0.032 in), guidance for installation can be found in several publicly available sources.

FAA AC 43.13-1B, MS33540, and FAA AC 43.13-1B identifies only 6 to 8 twists per inch (about 6 to 4 mm pitch). 43.13-1B has no other reference to twists per inch either by hand twisting with special tools. Aviation Mechanic Handbook identifies different twists per inch as 0.020–0.025 in (0.5–0.6 mm) at 8–14 twists per inch (~3-2 mm pitch), 0.032–0.041 in (0.8–1 mm) at 6–11 twists per inch (~4 to 2 mm pitch), and 0.051–0.060 in (1–2 mm) at 4–8 twists per inch (~6-3 mm pitch). The safety wire should be threaded through the object fastener such that it creates tension in the opposite direction of the fastener's removal. For example, if a standard automotive bolt in the U.S. is being secured, then the safety wire when installed should put tension on the bolt in a clockwise direction, since that is the direction that the bolt turns to tighten.

When drilling a fastener, the choice of where to drill it depends on the type of fastener and to what it will be wired. The alternative to drilling holes in fasteners is to use safety wire tabs (see Safety wire tabs section below), or to purchase pre-drilled fasteners.

AC43.13-1B, par. 7-124 f. page 7-21 specifies "Safety wire ends must be bent under and inward toward the part to avoid sharp or projecting ends, which might present a safety hazard." The first picture in this article does not conform to proper techniques and practices and ought to be replaced with a better example.

=== Witness wire ===
A more simplistic application of safety wire, more commonly referred to as witness wiring, is the use of light gauge, single strand, copper wire to provide positive visual confirmation of the security or closure of specific equipment within the aerospace industry. Common applications include the security of safety equipment such as fire extinguishers, and safety equipment bags, but also as an assurance that critical system switch covers remain in place, such as those associated with the application of fire suppression, or ejection systems. This application of witness wires is widely varied, and may cover a broad range of types of equipment and numerous situations.

Witness wires also serve the purpose of providing a rapid method for ensuring critical safety equipment or systems have not been used or tampered with since their last repair, reset, or inspection, and also that the container of such equipment has not been inadvertently opened, disturbed or tampered with, therefore providing confidence in their readiness for use. In a similar manner, critical system switch covers are protected from inadvertent activation, through the application of witness wire.

The gauge of copper wire utilized in this application is such that the wire security can be overcome with minimal breaking force by hand, without damage to the equipment or persons, and once broken, remains affixed to the equipment without the introduction of foreign object damage (FOD).

Typically the wire is threaded through existing holes in the associated equipment, using a single strand loop, and a single crossover, such that the closure is secured without impedance to the normal functioning of the equipment. The single crossover provides the appropriate friction such that the wire cannot fall completely free of the equipment when broken. The loose ends of the strand may be twisted in a pigtail fashion, or crimped with a lead seal, securing both strands as close to the closure as practical. In each case, the loose ends of the strands should be tucked neatly away from inadvertent impact.

== Equipment ==
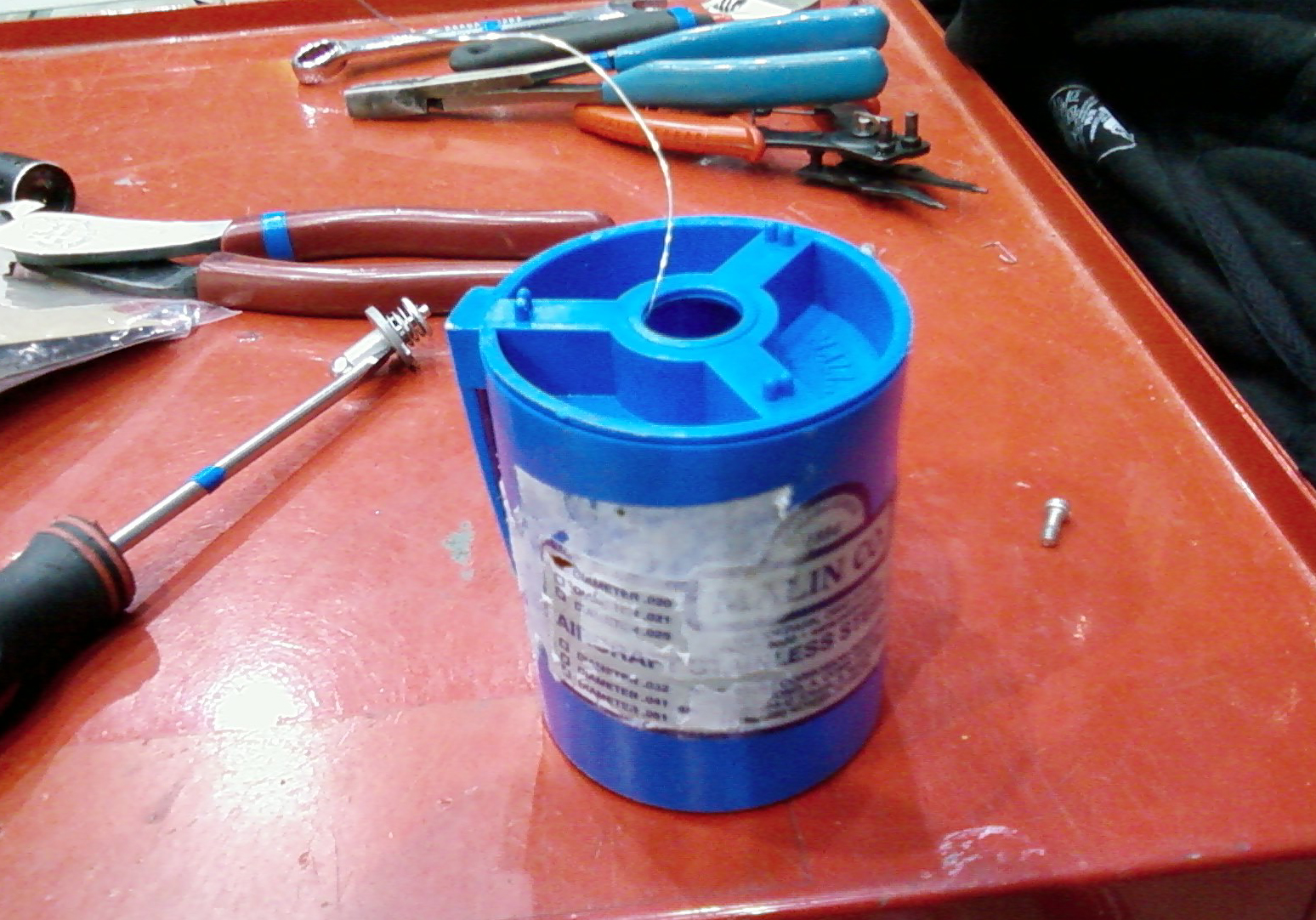
A one-pound spool of 0.5 mm (0.020 in) stainless steel safety wire

=== Safety wire ===
Safety wire is commonly 0.5, 0.6, 0.8 or 1 mm (0.020, 0.025, 0.032 or 0.041 in) in diameter, but 0.5-and-1 mm (0.021-and-0.051 in) diameters are also available. It is usually made of stainless steel, but is also available in monel and inconel alloys for high temperature applications and copper for break-away applications. For consumer applications, it is typically sold in 1 lb (0.45 kg) spools enclosed in a small cardboard or plastic canister.

=== Safety wire twisters ===
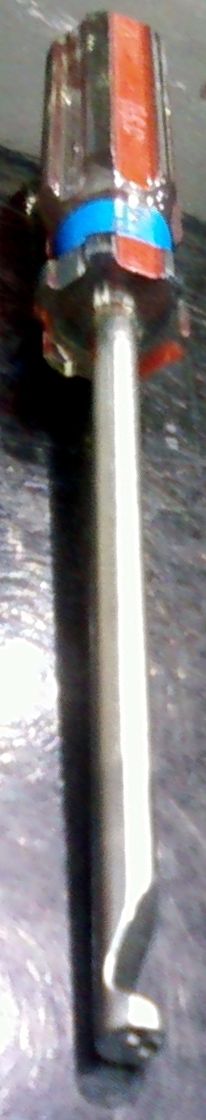
A "pignose" safety wire twister

A safety wire twister is a simple tool that allows the user to grip the two loose ends of a piece of safety wire and then, while holding the main barrel of the tool, turn the end that is not gripping the wire (which is bent to create a simple cranking mechanism) in order to twist the safety wire.

There is another type of basic safety wire twister which is similar to a standard screwdriver, except that the tip has a small grasping mechanism to hold the ends of the wire while the technician turns the handle to twist the wire. The advantage to this tool is its long and thin design, which can access hard-to-reach areas where one's hands or pliers do not fit. It is commonly referred to as a "pignose" due to its snout-like appearance.

=== Safety wire tabs ===
Safety wire tabs are washers that are used to secure fasteners by transferring the force of the safety wire to the head of the fastener to be secured. They are installed just like any other washer, after which the sides of the tab are bent up to make contact with the sides of the head of the fastener. One side of the tab is longer than the other with a small hole at the top, through which safety wire is threaded. Once the safety wire is properly installed, the sides of the tab transfer the force of the safety wire to the fastener, as though the fastener itself had been drilled and had the safety wire run through it.

The advantage of safety wire tabs is that the fastener to be secured does not need to be drilled, which can be advantageous for fasteners that should not or cannot be drilled because of size or damage concerns. They can also be useful when a fastener needs to be replaced, the replacement is not already drilled, and circumstances do not afford the time or tools to properly prepare the replacement fastener. The disadvantages are that it adds extra distance between the head of the fastener and the surface to which it is to be secured, and it is not as secure as securing the wire directly to the fastener itself as the tab could be a point of failure if it somehow unbends or the hole breaks (which is more likely than the hole in a drilled fastener failing due to the thinness and malleability of the material from which it is made).

=== Pre-drilled fasteners ===
For certain applications where safety wiring is common, fasteners come pre-drilled with holes to accept safety wire. When wiring something that did not come with pre-drilled fasteners stock, however, the more cost-effective way (as opposed to replacing all stock fasteners with pre-drilled ones of the same type) is often to drill the stock fasteners.

=== Drilling jigs ===
Because the use of twisted safety wire to secure fasteners requires the fasteners to be drilled, tool makers offer drill jigs to help technicians drill the fasteners to be secured. Although pre-drilled fasteners can be obtained, most fasteners to be secured start out never having been intended to be secured (e.g., a production motorcycle which was built for the street but which has been converted into a race-bike). Such fasteners need to be drilled. Drilling them is often difficult as, due to their small size and irregular shape, securing them properly and applying a drill effectively can be trying. As a result, technicians often break drill bits or damage the fastener when the bit slides off position. A useful tool is a drill press, because it allows the technician to apply the force of the drill bit directly to the fastener being drilled and eliminates lateral movement; but even with a press the fastener needs to be secured to prevent it from sliding out from beneath the bit. Even though drill presses ease the process, a press isn't always available, such as at a race event; and even with a press, the problem of securing the fastener still exists. To solve those problems, jigs are available which are designed to securely hold the fastener while providing a guide-channel for a drill bit (with either a hand drill or a press) so that the technician can easily and directly apply force from the drill to the fastener without having it slip off or breaking the bit.

== Advantages and disadvantages ==
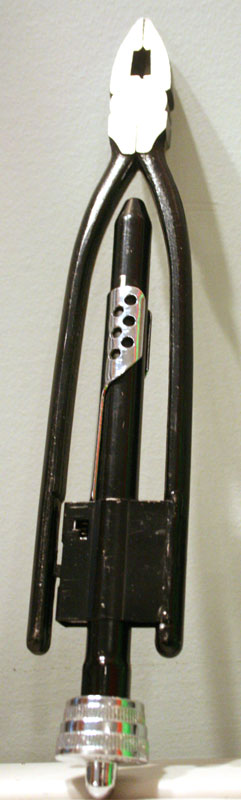
Safety wire pliers

Although many systems purport to be more efficient than installing traditional safety wire, an advantageous by-product of the twisting method of installing safety wire is that it leaves a highly visible and easily inspectable indication that the fasteners in question are in fact properly secured.

In addition, safety wire twisting is a standard, non-proprietary technique, and tools and materials can be easily found, cheaply purchased, and mixed with other brands while still working properly (provided of course that all components are used properly and with the proper types of complementary components and tools, if not brands).

The primary disadvantage of traditional safety wire is the time it requires to install properly when securing fasteners, although technicians who use it often can implement it fairly quickly. It also leaves behind waste products when ends are clipped off or when it is cut off secured fasteners that need to be removed during maintenance, resulting in sharp metal bits that can easily damage soft materials or injure skin. However, the amount of waste product is relatively small, it is non-toxic, and the hazard can be mitigated altogether if technicians properly dispose of any waste product. When clipping off ends, the ends can go flying off which makes their recovery difficult and can cause injury to anyone in the immediate vicinity, such as the technician or an assistant; however, this can also be easily mitigated by using extra care or by using safety wire pliers that have a special insert that is designed to catch clipped off ends. Another disadvantage is that since the manual skill required to implement traditional safety wire is easily learned, the techniques required to maximize the retentive force of safety wire (e.g., in which direction the retentive force should be exerted, the direction of twist, proper angles for securing multiple fasteners, proper twists per inch, or alternatively pitch in millimeters, which type of wire to use, etc.) are often ignored by non-formally trained technicians (e.g., hobbyists) who use safety wire for their projects. Wire can prevent nuts from falling off, but can not prevent fatigue failure which results when low tensioned bolts are exposed to vibration.

== Alternatives ==
There are also other systems of fastener retention that do not rely on safety wire at all, such as lock washers, locknuts, jam nuts, thread-locking fluid, castellated nuts and cotter pins, all of which accomplish a similar objective as safety wire, which is to prevent nuts backing off (falling off). Locknuts such as Nyloc nuts and HARDLOCK nuts have the additional objective of preventing lost bolt tension. Loss of bolt tension can cause fatigue failure in the joint.
