= Slotted nut =

Slotted nut or slot nut can refer to:

- Castellated nut also slotted nut
- Split beam nut also slotted beam nut
- T-slot nut
