= Positive locking device =

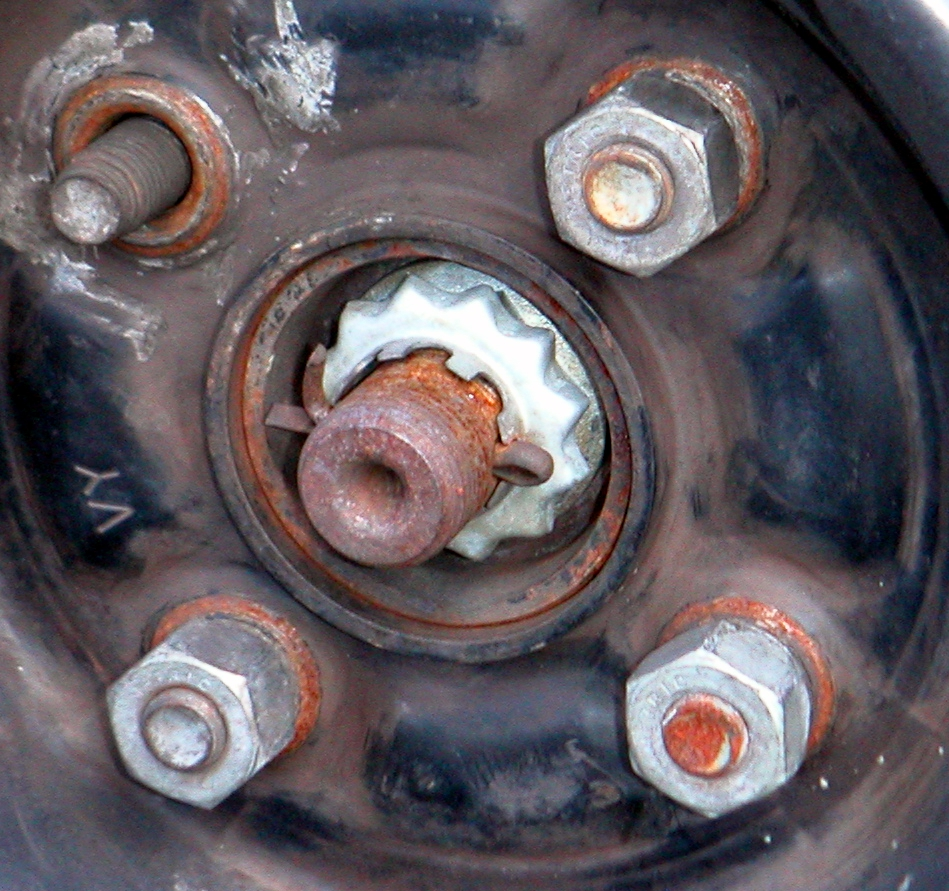
A wheel hub with a castellated nut secured in the center using a cotter pin to prevent it from unscrewing

A positive locking device is a device used in conjunction with a fastener in order to positively lock the fastener. This means that the fastener cannot work loose from vibrations. The following is a list of positive locking devices:

- A split beam nut
- A castellated nut and a split pin
- A hex nut or cap screw and a tab washer
- A hex nut or cap screw and a lock plate
- Safety wiring with various types of fasteners

7-122. GENERAL. The word safetying is a term universally used in the aircraft industry. Briefly, safetying is defined as: "Securing by various means any nut, bolt, turnbuckle etc., on the aircraft so that vibration will not cause it to loosen during operation." These practices are not a means of obtaining or maintaining torque, rather a safety device to prevent the disengagement of screws, nuts, bolts, snap rings, oil caps, drain cocks, valves, and parts. Three basic methods are used in safetying; safety-wire, cotter pins, and self-locking nuts. Retainer washers and pal nuts are also sometimes used.

7-124d. Safety wire must be installed in a manner that will prevent the tendency of the part to loosen.

A locking plate

A tab washer
