= Tank connector =

Tank connectors are a type of tank fitting also known as bulkhead fittings, tank inlets, tank outlets, or tank nipples. They are designed to allow the passage of liquids through the sealed walls of tanks or vessels, ensuring leak-proof connection. This fitting must be leakage proof, as the water supply (inward and outward) depends on same. Many different varieties of tank connectors exist.

Tank connectors are widely made of plastic (PVC) or brass. They have a flange either on the edge of one side or in the center. They are supplemented with a rubber washer or a plastic washer with one or two hexagonal flange nuts to tighten the connector to the tank wall. Those with two nuts usually require some silicone or other sealant to prevent fluid passing along the threads.

The size of a connector varies from 1/2 to 4 in.
