= Half nut =

Half nut may refer to:

In mechanical engineering:

- A half-thickness nut, used as a locknut or jam nut
- A split nut
