= Junker test =

Mechanical test

A Junker test is a mechanical test to determine the point at which a bolted joint loses its preload when subjected to shear loading caused by transverse vibration.

Design engineers apply the Junker test to determine the point at which fastener securing elements – such as lock nuts, wedges and lock washers – fail when subjected to vibration. The data collected by the test enables design engineers to specify fasteners that will perform under a wide range of conditions without loosening.

Research into the causes of vibration-induced self-loosening of threaded fasteners spans six decades and the causes of self-loosening are now well understood. It was pioneering experimental research into the behaviour of bolted joints under transverse loads, conducted by German engineer Gerhard Junker in the late 1960s which underpins modern theories on self-loosening behaviour.

Junker’s test methodology and apparatus described in his 1969 paper has since become known as the Junker test and has been adopted into international fastener standards such as DIN 65151. The Junker test is the established method used for analysing the self-loosening behaviour of secured and unsecured threaded fasteners under transverse loading conditions by vibration testing.
