= Nuki (joinery) =

Type of Japanese carpentry joint

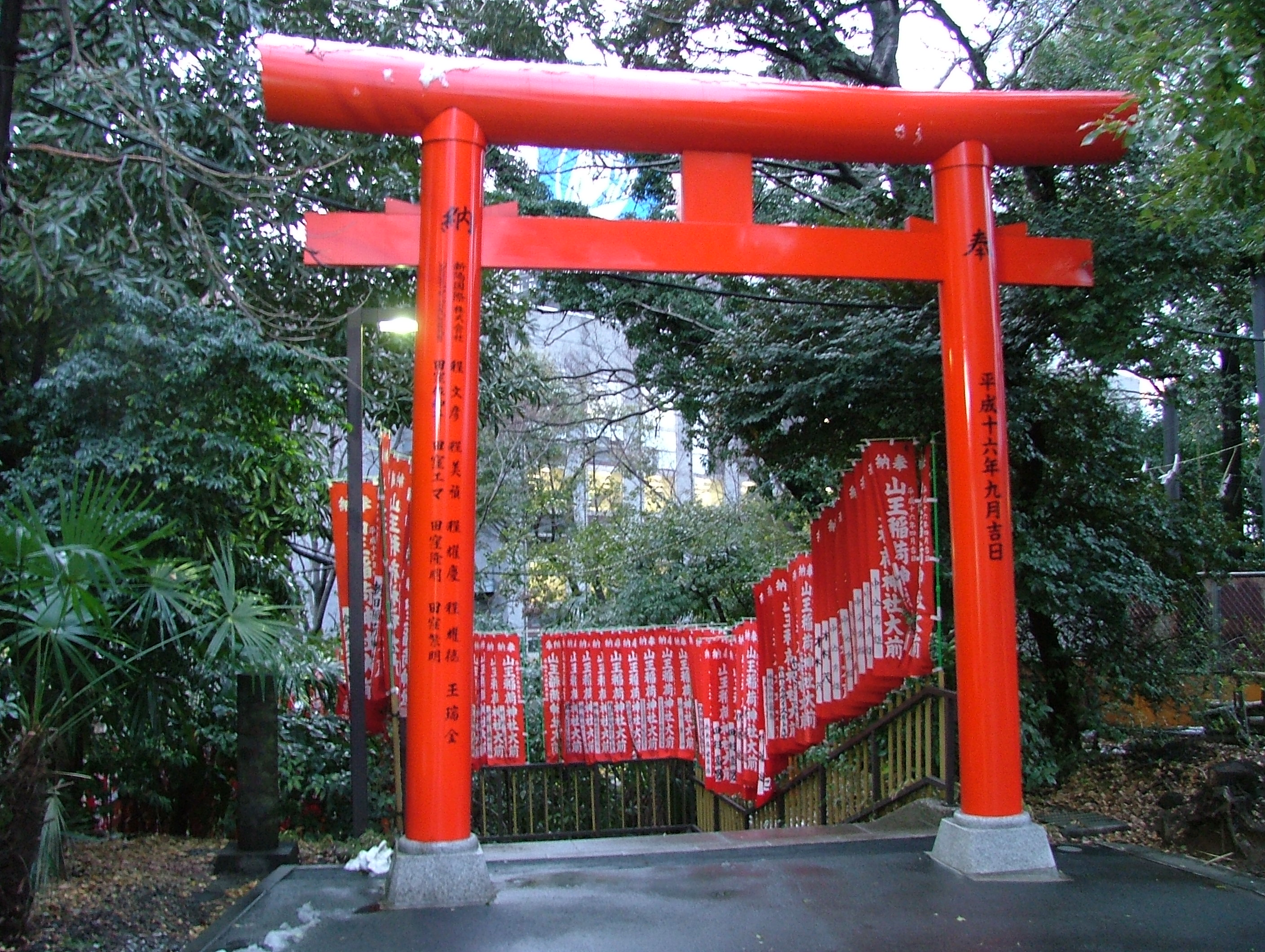
A traditional Japanese torii gate. Slightly below the top rail is a second horizontal rail, called nuki, which is an example of a nuki joint.

Nuki is a Japanese style of carpentry joint connection. Nuki joints are common in Japanese and oriental carpentry, and comprise one of the simplest structural connectors. They are similar to mortise and tenon joints, and have been used traditionally in historic buildings, such as Shinto shrines and Buddhist temples, and also in modern domestic houses. The basic principle involves penetrating one element through another (i.e., embedment); in Japan and other Asian countries this method is used to connect wooden posts and beams.
