= Interfering thread nut =

Type of locknut

An interfering thread nut is a type of locknut that has an undersized root diameter. This creates an interference between the nut and the fastener, plastically deforming the threads on the fastener. Due to this deformation they are usually only used on permanent or semi-permanent installations.

A variation of this nut is the tapered thread nut. It utilizes a tapered thread to achieve the interference. The nut goes on easily, because the thread diameter starts at a standard size; as the nut is further threaded on it begins to lock, much like a distorted thread locknut.
