= Jet nut =

A jet nut, also known as a k-nut, is a special type of hex locknut that is commonly used in the aerospace and automotive racing industries.

It has a flange on one end of the nut, the hex is smaller than a standard sized hex nut, and it is shorter than a standard hex nut. It achieves its locking action by using an elliptical offset on the un-flanged end of the nut.
