= Serrated face nut =

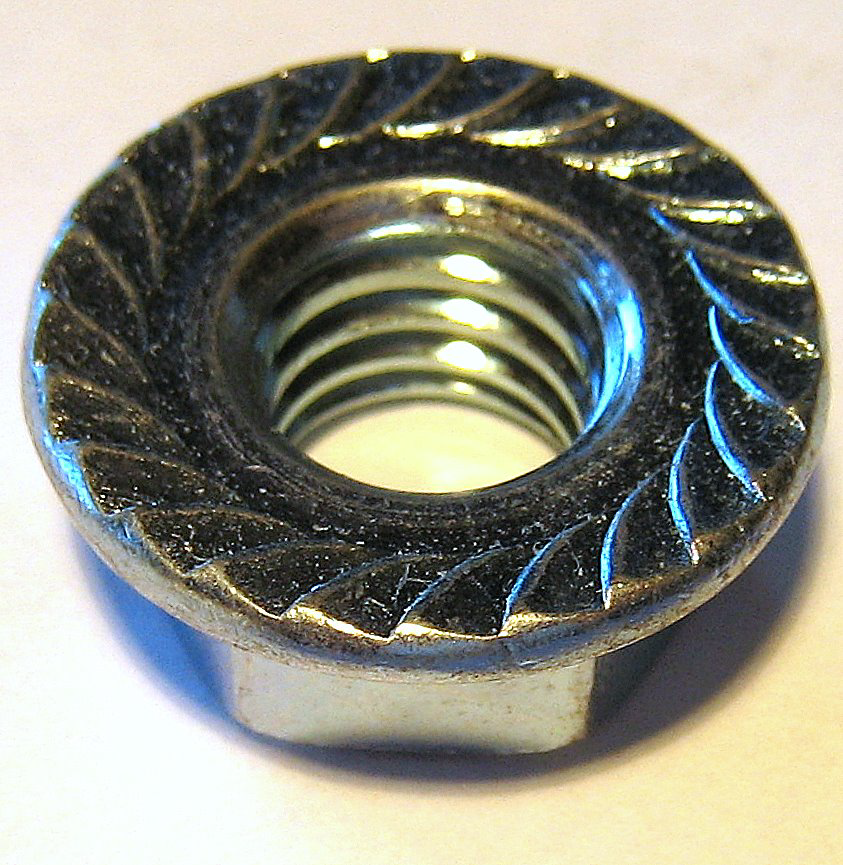
Serrated face nut

A serrated face nut is a locknut with ridges on the face of the nut that bite into the surface it is tightened against. The serrations are angled such that they keep the nut from rotating in the direction that would loosen the nut. Due to the serrations they cannot be used with a washer or on surfaces that cannot be scratched. Sometimes both faces of the nut are serrated, permitting either side to lock.

== See also ==
- Serrated flange nut
