= Distorted thread locknut =

Type of locknut

A distorted thread locknut, is a type of locknut that uses a deformed section of thread to keep the nut from loosening due to vibrations, or rotation of the clamped item. There are four types: elliptical offset nuts, centerlock nuts, toplock nuts and partially depitched (Philidas) nuts.

== High temperature use ==
Because these nuts are solid metal, they remain effective at high temperatures, unlike nyloc nuts. High-grade nuts can withstand temperatures up to 1,400 °F (760 °C).

== Safety factors ==
High-strength distorted thread nuts cannot be used with low-strength fasteners because the hard nut will act like a die and destroy the threads on the fastener.

== Elliptical offset nuts ==
Elliptical offset nuts is a catch-all category that encompasses designs known as oval locknuts or non-slotted hex locknuts. The salient feature is that the thread has been deformed at one end so that the threads are no longer perfectly circular. The deformed end is usually shaped into an ellipse or obround triangle. These are known as one-way nuts as the nut may be easily started on the male fastener from the bottom non-deformed portion but is practically impossible to start from the deformed end. As the male fastener reaches the deformed section it stretches the threads of the nut elastically back into a circle. This action increases the friction between the nut and the fastener greatly and creates the locking action. Due to the elastic nature of the deformation the nuts can be reused indefinitely.

== Centerlock nuts ==
Centerlock wheel nuts are similar to elliptical offset nuts, except that they are distorted in the middle of the nut. This allows the nut to be started from either side.

== Toplock nuts ==
Toplock nuts are also similar to elliptical offset nuts, except that the whole thread on one end is not distorted. Instead only three small sections of the thread are deformed on one end.

== Partially depitched nuts ==
Partially depitched nuts are commonly called Philidas nuts, after their originator and current manufacturer, and differ from the above three nut types insofar as a portion of the thread is displaced axially, this being facilitated by one or more slots perpendicular to the axis.

== See also ==
- Split beam nut
