= Thread-locking compound =

Adhesive applied to screw threads

A bottle of Loctite thread-locking fluid

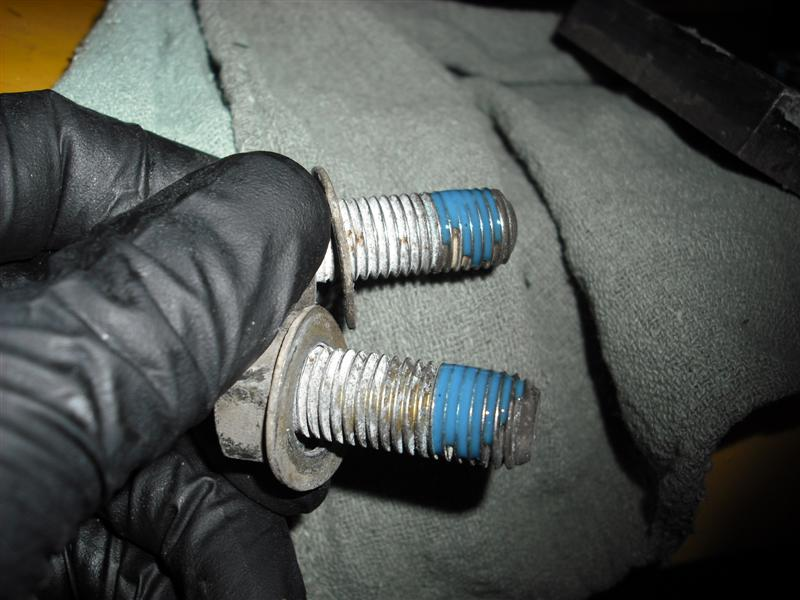
Bolts with thread-locking fluid applied

Thread-locking compound or threadlocker is a single-component adhesive, applied to the threads of fasteners such as screws and bolts to prevent loosening, leakage, and corrosion.

Most thread-locking compounds are methacrylate-based and rely on the electrochemical activity of a metal substrate to cause polymerization of the fluid. It can be permanent or removable; in the latter case, it may be removable merely by force or may also require heating, for example. Typically, brands are color-coded to indicate strength and whether they can be removed easily or require heat for removal.

== History ==
Thread-locking compound was developed by American professor Vernon K. Krieble in 1953. His company, American Sealants, founded the Loctite brand. An early version of the compound was patented in 1960.

== Properties ==
Typically, thread-locking compounds are methacrylate-based, and cure anaerobically (hardens in the absence of oxygen) when exposed to clean metals. Thread-locking compound is often a thixotropic fluid: under shear stress, it exhibits a time-dependent decrease in viscosity to allow it to be squeezed into place but not flow too quickly on its own.

Thread-locking fluid is typically sold in small containers, in amounts from 5 millilitres (about one teaspoon) to 250 millilitres (8.5 US fl oz). Thread-locking compound is also sold as paste in sticks and in tape form, similar to teflon tape.

Typical properties of thread-locking compounds
Type	Typical color	Torque to break free (3/8-16 (9.53 mm) size bolt)	Torque to continue turning	Temperature range
Low strength	■ Purple	7 N⋅m (62 lb⋅in)	3 N⋅m (27 lb⋅in)	−54 to 149 °C (−65 to 300 °F)
Medium strength	■ Blue	12 N⋅m (110 lb⋅in)	6 N⋅m (53 lb⋅in)	−54 to 149 °C (−65 to 300 °F)
Medium strength surface insensitive	■ Blue	20 N⋅m (180 lb⋅in)	7 N⋅m (62 lb⋅in)	−54 to 149 °C (−65 to 300 °F)
High strength	■ Red	25 N⋅m (220 lb⋅in)	25 N⋅m (220 lb⋅in)	−54 to 149 °C (−65 to 300 °F)
High temperature	■ Red	20 N⋅m (180 lb⋅in)	30 N⋅m (270 lb⋅in)	−54 to 232 °C (−65 to 450 °F)
Penetrating	■ Green	10 N⋅m (89 lb⋅in)	35 N⋅m (310 lb⋅in)	−54 to 149 °C (−65 to 300 °F)

== Application and care ==
Thread-locking compound may be applied before or after assembly, depending on the type. Thread-locking compounds are available in varieties of "permanent", "removable", and "low-strength" formulas. Many brands color-code the container and the compound itself to indicate the degree of permanency. The low-strength types prevent loosening under vibration, but may still be readily disassembled. Removable types resist higher amounts of vibration, but may still be disassembled with hand or power tools. The strongest permanent thread-locking compounds are rated at 21 MPa (3,000 psi) in shear strength. The applied torque required to loosen a fastener with permanent compound may exceed the yield strength of the fastener itself, such that attempting disassembly by force may twist off the stem of the fastener. However, high-strength permanent thread-locking compounds become potentially removable by heating the assembly, typically to 230 °C (446 °F).

Working temperatures for fasteners with thread-locking compound are typically limited to 150 °C (300 °F), which is below the softening point of the methacrylate polymer. Above this temperature, the material softens and strength reduces.

Lock washers, locknuts, jam nuts, and safety wire may be used in conjunction with thread-locking compound to prevent loosening of bolted joints.

=== Surface interaction and curing ===
Thread-locking compounds typically rely on the electrochemical activity of a metal substrate to form a bond; surfaces must be clean to develop the full bonding strength. In the case of less electrochemically active metals such as the normally oxidised surface of aluminium, an additional step of priming is required for full strength results. Surface-insensitive thread-locking compounds do not require activation by metal ions, and can be used with non-reactive, oxidized or soiled surfaces.

Because electrochemical activity is one of the two triggers that cause polymerization of the thread-locking compound, care must be taken to avoid contaminating the container with any thread-locking compound that has had contact with metal, or the material in the container may polymerize.
