= Philidas =

Philidas Distribution Ltd.
- Company type: Privately held company
- Industry: Manufacturer of automotive and industrial nuts and components
- Founded: Pontefract, West Yorkshire, England, 1942
- Area served: Global distribution
- Website: www.philidas.com

Philidas Ltd. (previously named Infast Philidas) is a company based in Pontefract, West Yorkshire, England that manufactures nuts and components for automotive and industrial applications.

== History ==
The company was established in 1942, and is a branch of the Haden MacLellan engineering group. Prior to this the company was a part of B Elliott, which sold Philidas to Haden MacLellan in 2000. Philidas manufactures automobile fasteners in both small and large-scale batches. The company's products are distributed on a global basis. In 2005, it was reported that the company manufactures 110 million fasteners annually. Philidas had a factory on Monkhill Lane, Pontefract. But this closed in January 2014. Some of Philidas' clients include BMW, Jaguar, Ford and Bosch.

== Philidas nut ==
A Philidas nut is a locknut with one or more slots cut laterally in the reduced-diameter circular top for less than half the diameter, the metal above the slot(s) being deformed downwards so that over the last one or two turns, the thread for half the diameter is "axially depitched" or displaced from its normal position. As the nut is threaded on, the displaced sections are elastically forced back axially to their original position, the load increasing the friction between the nut and the fastener, creating the locking action. These nuts retain their locking action at temperatures limited only by the base material, as no polymeric insert is used, and as the locking action is by elastic deformation, they can be re-used multiple times. They may look similar, but differ substantially from the split beam nut because the former has a radial displacement of the deformed portion, while the Philidas nut uses axial deflection or depitching.

There are at least two basic types, the original "Industrial" type with two slots, one on each side of the diameter but axially aligned, and the "Turret" where both slots are aligned radially, one above the other. The Turret type appears to reduce the risk of failure of the locking action due to fracture between the base of both slots, which may be a limitation of the Industrial type.

Philidas, the original and current manufacturer, is a tradename for these nuts, which were patented in 1942.
