= Embedment =

Embedment is a phenomenon in mechanical engineering in which the surfaces between mechanical members of a loaded joint embed. It can lead to failure by fatigue as described below, and is of particular concern when considering the design of critical fastener joints.

== Mechanism ==
The mechanism behind embedment is different from creep. When the loading of the joint varies (e.g. due to vibration or thermal expansion) the protruding points of the imperfect surfaces will see local stress concentrations and yield until the stress concentration is relieved. Over time, surfaces can flatten an appreciable amount in the order of thousandths of an inch.

== Consequences ==
In critical fastener joints, embedment can mean loss of preload. Flattening of a surface allows the strain of a screw to relax, which in turn correlates with a loss in tension and thus preload. In bolted joints with particularly short grip lengths, the loss of preload due to embedment can be especially significant, causing complete loss of preload. Therefore, embedment can lead directly to loosening of a fastener joint and subsequent fatigue failure.

In bolted joints, most of the embedment occurs during torquing. Only embedment that occurs after installation can cause a loss of preload, and values of up to 0.0005 inches can be seen at each surface mate, as reported by SAE.

== Prevention and solutions ==
Embedment can be prevented by designing mating surfaces of a joint to have high surface hardness and very smooth surface finish. Exceptionally hard and smooth surfaces will have less susceptibility to the mechanism that causes embedment.

In most cases, some degree of embedment is inevitable. That said, short grip lengths should be avoided. For two bolted joints of identical design and installation, except the second having a longer grip length, the first joint will be more likely to loosen and fail. Since both joints have the same loading, the surfaces will experience the same amount of embedment. However, the relaxation in strain is less significant to the longer grip length and the loss in preload will be minimized. For this reason, bolted joints should always be designed with careful consideration for the grip length.

If a short grip length can not be avoided, the use of conical spring washers (Belleville washers or disc springs) can also reduce the loss of bolt pre-load due to embedment.

== See also ==
- Stress relaxation
