= Flange nut =

Nut that has a wide flange at one end

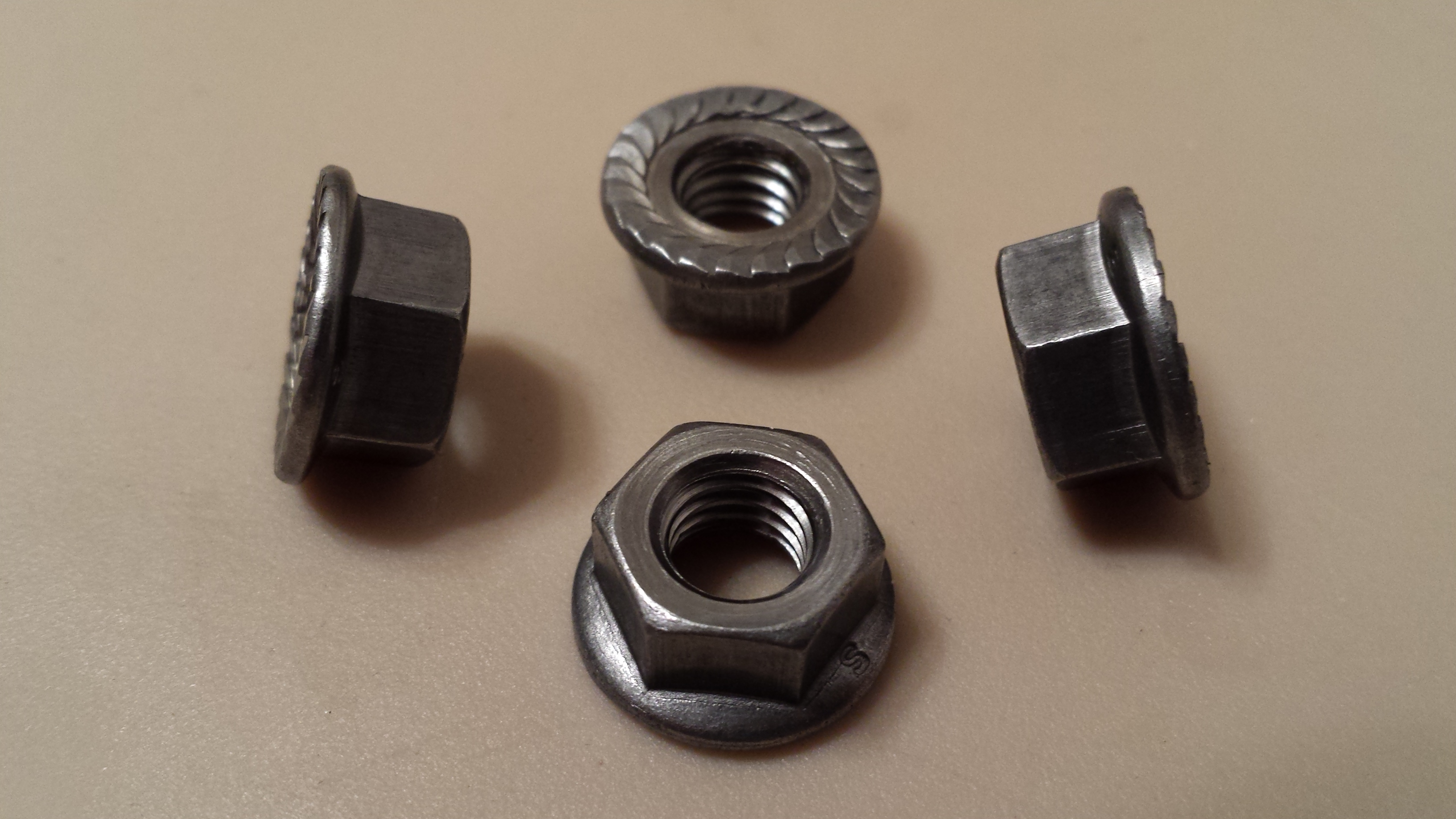
Serrated flange nuts

A flange nut is a nut that has a wide flange at one end that acts as an integrated washer. This serves to distribute the pressure of the nut over the part being secured, reducing the chance of damage to the part and making it less likely to loosen as a result of an uneven fastening surface. These nuts are mostly hexagonal in shape and are made up of hardened steel and often coated with zinc.

Flange nuts (and bolts) are widely used in automobiles and electronic products.

== Variants ==
=== Serrated flange nut ===
The flange may be serrated to provide a locking action. On a serrated flange nut, the serrations are angled such that they keep the nut from rotating in the direction that would loosen the nut. Because of the serrations they cannot be used with a washer or on surfaces that must not be scratched. The serrations help in preventing the vibration of the nut from moving the fastener, thus maintaining the holding power of the nut.

=== Self-aligning nut ===
A self-aligning nut, also known as a spherical nut or leveling nut, is a type of nut used in applications where the fastener is not perpendicular to the surface to which the nut anchors. A flange nut is used inside a specially shaped dished-out washer. The device is commonly used in the aerospace industry. If this nut were not used the object would have to be spot faced so as to provide a surface perpendicular to the fastener.

== Standards ==
The following specifications define flange nuts:

- ASME B18.2.2
- ISO 4161
- DIN EN 1661, and the DIN 6923 which it has superseded
- JIS B 1190
- JASO F 126 (used in the Japanese automotive industry)

== See also ==
- Keps nut
- Serrated face nut
