= Split beam nut =

A split beam nut, also known as a split hex nut or slotted beam nut, is a locknut with slots cut in the top that separate the outside end into two or more sections that are bent slightly inward, making the thread diameter undersized in the slotted portion. As the nut is threaded on, these sections are forced back out to their original position and increase the friction between the nut and the fastener, creating the locking action.

== High temperature use ==
High strength grades retain their locking ability up to 1,400 °F (760 °C), unlike nyloc nuts. Military grade nuts can be reused at least a dozen times.

== Trademark ==
Aerotight is a tradename for a specific type of split beam nut. Other names for this type of nut are stiff nut and Allmetal self locking nut.

== See also ==
- Elliptical offset locknut
