= Jam nut =

Type of locknut

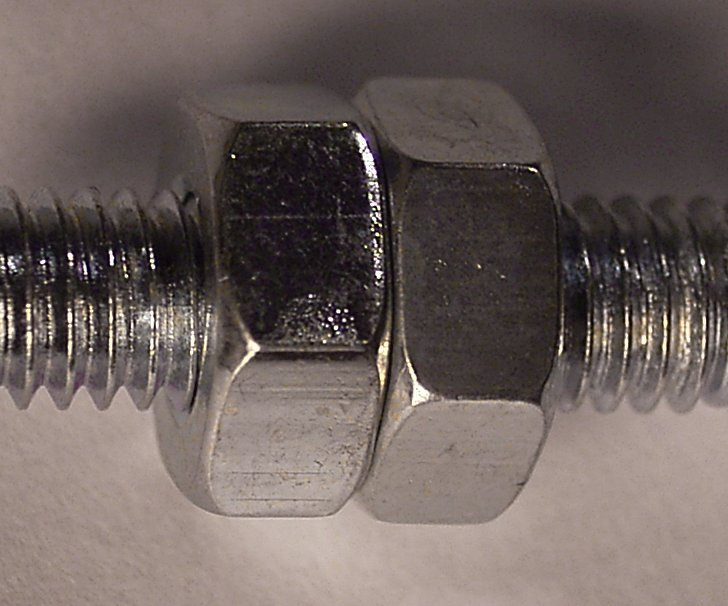
Standard nut employed as a jam nut against another standard nut

A jam nut is a low profile type of nut, typically half as tall as a standard nut. It is commonly used as a type of locknut, where it is "jammed" up against a standard nut to lock the two in place. It is also used in situations where a standard nut would not fit.

The term "jam nut" can also refer to any nut that is used in the same function (even a standard nut used for the jamming purpose). Jam nuts, other types of locknuts, lock washers, and thread-locking fluid are ways to prevent vibration from loosening a bolted joint.

== Use of two nuts to prevent self-loosening ==
In normal use, a nut-and-bolt joint holds together because the bolt is under a constant tensile stress called the preload. The preload pulls the nut threads against the bolt threads, and the nut face against the bearing surface, with a constant force, so that the nut cannot rotate without overcoming the friction between these surfaces. If the joint is subjected to vibration, however, the preload increases and decreases with each cycle of movement. If the minimum preload during the vibration cycle is not enough to hold the nut firmly in contact with the bolt and the bearing surface, then the nut is likely to become loose.

Specialized locking nuts exist to prevent this problem, but sometimes it is sufficient to add a second nut. For this technique to be reliable, each nut must be tightened to the correct torque. The inner nut is tightened to about a quarter to a half of the torque of the outer nut. It is then held in place by a wrench while the outer nut is tightened on top using the full torque. This arrangement causes the two nuts to push against each other, creating a tensile stress in the short section of the bolt that lies between them. Even when the main joint is vibrated, the stress between the two nuts remains constant, thus holding the nut threads in constant contact with the bolt threads and preventing self-loosening. When the joint is assembled correctly, the outer nut bears the full tension of the joint. The inner nut functions merely to add a small additional force to the outer nut and does not need to be as strong, so a thin nut can be used.

The jam nut essentially acts as the "other object", as the two nuts are tightened against each other. They can also be used to secure an item on a fastener without applying force to that object. This is achieved by first tightening one of the nuts onto the item. Then the other nut is screwed down on top of the first nut. The inner nut is then slackened back and tightened against the outer nut.

Jam nuts can also be used in situations where a threaded rod must be rotated. Since threaded rods have no bolt heads, it is difficult or impossible to apply torque to a threaded rod. A pair of jam nuts is used to create a point where a wrench may be used.

Jam nuts can be unreliable under significant loads. If the inner nut is torqued more than the outer nut, the outer nut may yield. If the outer nut is torqued more than the inner nut, the inner nut may loosen up.
