= Castellated nut =

Nut with slots cut into one end

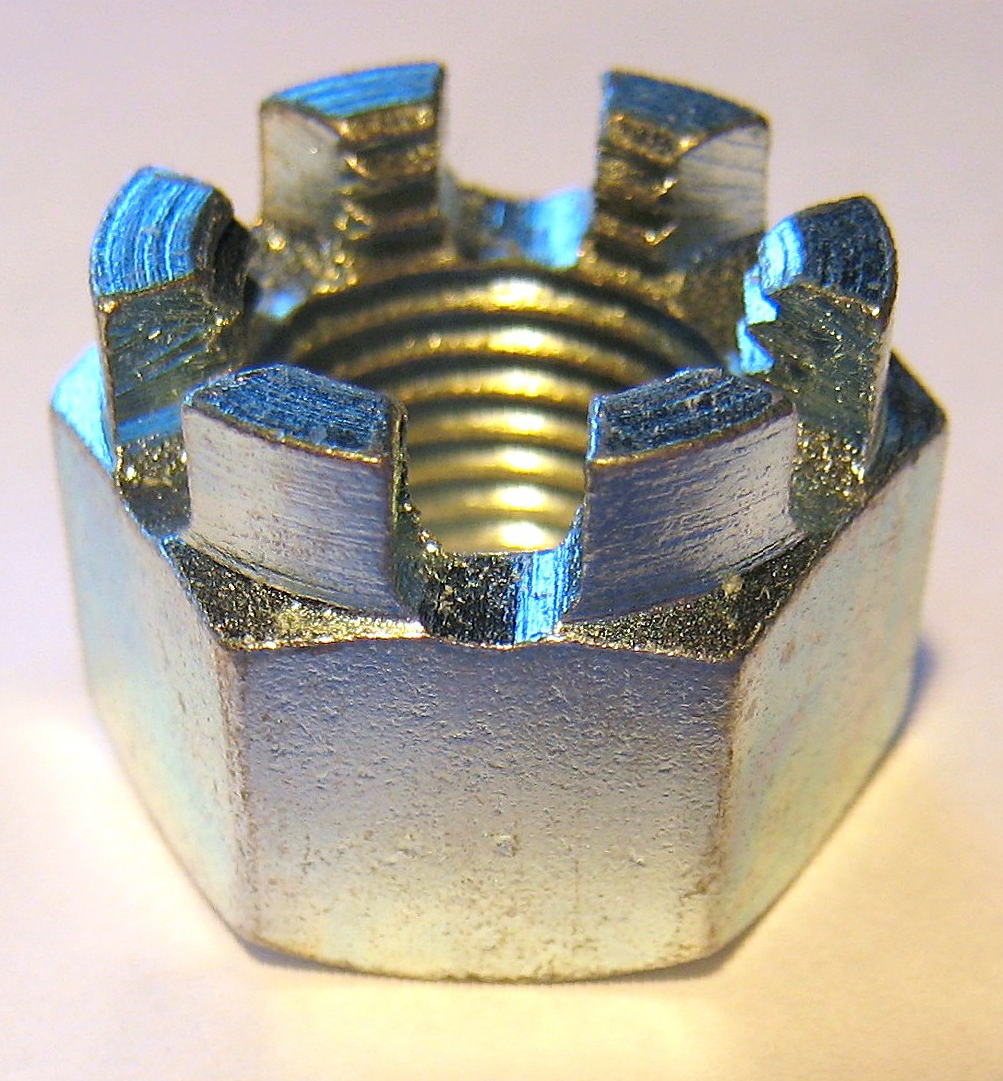
A castellated nut

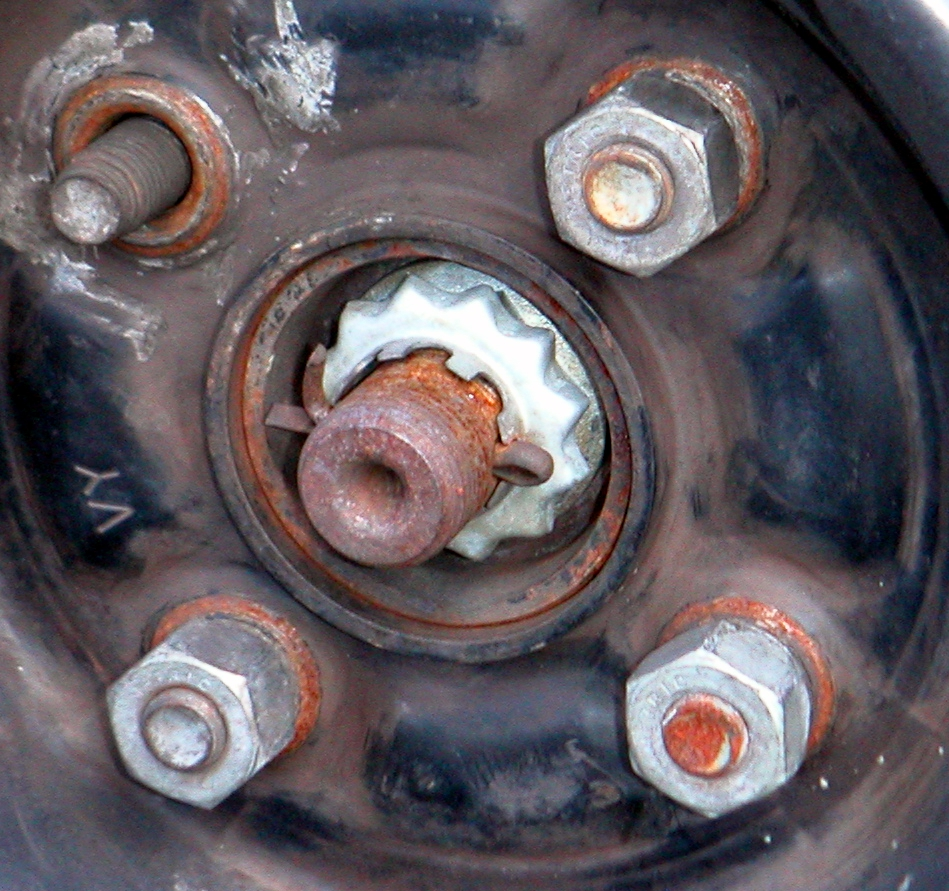
A car wheel hub, with the central nut hidden behind a castellated nut cover that is locked against rotation using a cotter pin. The effect is similar to using a castellated nut.

A castellated nut, sometimes referred to as a castle nut, is a nut with slots or notches cut into one end. The name comes from the nut's resemblance to the crenellated parapet of a medieval castle. Castellated nuts are sometimes incorrectly referred to as castigated nuts.

While castellated nuts are often referred to as slotted nuts, from a technical perspective, slotted nuts differ slightly from castellated nuts. Castellated nuts are formed with a round section at the top where the slots are located. Slotted nuts do not have this rounded modification. The flat sides of slotted nuts extend fully from the top to the bottom of the nut. Both castellated and slotted nuts are designed to use a pin (usually a split pin) that fits through the slots and through a hole in the screw to which the nut is attached. This pin prevents the nut from turning and loosening. Compared with slotted nuts, castellated nuts allow the cotter pin to be confined closer to the margins of the nut itself, providing added security.

The bolt has one or two holes drilled through its threaded end. The nut is torqued properly and then, if the slot is not aligned with the hole in the fastener, the nut is rotated forward to the nearest slot. The nut is then secured with a split pin/cotter pin, R-clip or safety wire. It is a positive locking device.

Castellated nuts are used in low-torque applications, such as holding a wheel bearing in place.
