= Washer (hardware) =

Thin plate with a hole, normally used to distribute the load of a threaded fastener

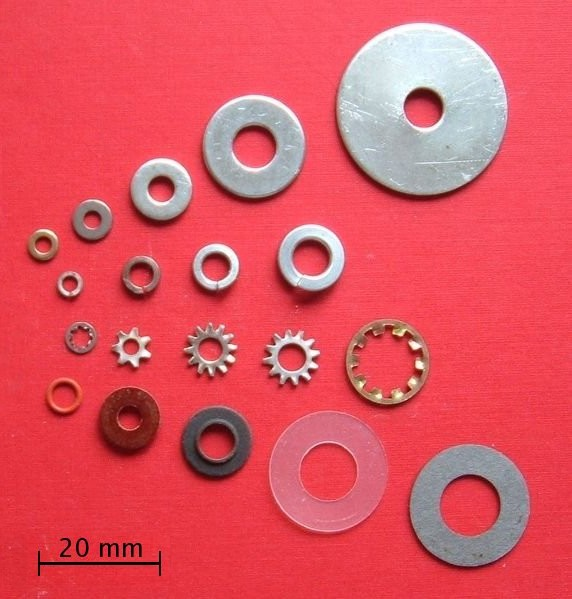
Assorted washers

A washer is a thin plate (typically disk-shaped, but sometimes square) with a hole (typically in the middle) that is normally used to distribute the load of a threaded fastener, such as a bolt or nut. Other uses of washers are as a spacer, spring (Belleville washer, wave washer), wear pad, preload indicating device, locking device, and to reduce vibration (rubber washer).

Washers are usually metal or plastic. High-quality bolted joints require hardened steel washers to prevent the loss of pre-load due to brinelling after the torque is applied. Washers are also important for preventing galvanic corrosion, particularly by insulating steel screws from aluminium surfaces. They may also be used in rotating devices, as a bearing. A thrust washer is used when a rolling element bearing is not needed either from a cost-performance perspective or due to space restraints. Coatings can be used to reduce wear and friction, either by hardening the surface or by providing a solid lubricant (i.e. a self-lubricating surface).

Rubber or fiber gaskets used in taps (or faucets, valves, and other piping connections) as seal against water leaks are sometimes referred to colloquially as washers; but, while they may look similar, washers and gaskets are usually designed for different functions and made differently.

== Etymology ==
The origin of the word is unknown. The first recorded use of the word was in 1346; however, the first time its definition was recorded was in 1611.

== Washer types ==
Most washers can be categorized into three broad types;

- Plain washers, which spread a load, and prevent damage to the adjacent surface, or which provide some sort of insulation (such as electrical insulation)
- Spring washers, which have axial flexibility and are used to prevent fastening or loosening due to vibrations
- Locking washers, which prevent fastening or loosening by preventing unscrewing rotation of the fastening device; locking washers are usually also spring washers.

=== Plain washers ===
Name(s)	Image	Description
Plain washer (or "flat washer")		A flat annulus or ring, often of metal, used to spread the load of a screwed fastening. Additionally, a plain washer may be used when the hole is a larger diameter than the fixing nut.
Fender washer (US), penny washer, mudguard washer, or "repair washer" (UK)		A flat washer with a particularly large outer diameter (OD) in proportion to its central hole. These are commonly used to spread the load on thin sheet metal, and are named after their use on automobile fenders. They can also be used to make a connection to a hole that has been enlarged by rust or wear. In the UK, the name originally comes from the size of the old British penny. In the UK, most industries refer to all large OD washers as penny washers, even when the OD is as much as twice the size of the old penny. An archaic form of this washer was sold as a "pot mender", usually in small quantities through a retail ironmonger. This included two washers, a nut, and bolt, and a sealing washer of rubber, cork, or fibre sheet. They could be used for sealing small holes, rust spots or removed pipe connections in water tanks or large cooking vessels.
Spherical washer nut and screw		Part of a self-aligning nut; it is a washer with one radiused surface, which is designed to be used in conjunction with a mating nut in order to allow for up to several degrees of misalignment between parts.
Anchor plate or wall washer		A large plate or washer connected to a tie rod or bolt. Anchor plates are used on exterior walls of masonry buildings, for structural reinforcement. Being visible, many anchor plates are made in a style that is decorative.
Torque washer		Used in woodworking in combination with a carriage bolt; it has a square hole in the centre into which the carriage bolt square fits. Teeth or prongs on the washer bite into the wood, preventing the bolt from spinning freely when a nut is being tightened.

=== Spring and locking washers ===
Name(s)	Image	Description
Belleville washer, also called cupped spring washer or conical washer		A washer with a slight conical shape, which provides an axial force when deformed. The surface may be serrated, which will have improved locking capabilities.
Curved disc spring		Similar to a Belleville, except the washer is curved in only one direction, therefore there are only four points of contact. Unlike Belleville washers, they exert only light pressures.
Wave washers		A washer with a "wave" in the axial direction, which provides spring pressure when compressed. Wave washers, of comparable size, do not produce as much force as Belleville washers. In Germany, they are sometimes used as lock washers but they are less effective than other choices. (Note: Bowmans Fastener Technical Fast of 1999 on page 32 and 33 has SAE recommendation from 1969 that lock washers not be used in any critical application. BMW motorcycles experienced a series of broken lock washers and BMW then disallowed their use in U-joints due to the damage of loss of the spacer and nut loosening.)
Split washer or spring lock washer		A ring split at one point and bent into a helical shape. This causes the washer to exert a spring force between the fastener's head and the substrate, which maintains the washer hard against the substrate and the bolt thread hard against the nut or substrate thread, creating more friction and resistance to rotation. Applicable standards are ASME B18.21.1, DIN 127 B, and United States Military Standard NASM 35338 (formerly MS 35338 and AN-935). Spring washers are a left hand helix and allow the thread to be tightened in a right hand direction only, i.e. a clockwise direction. When a left hand turning motion is applied, the raised edge bites into the underside of the bolt or nut and the part that it is bolted to, thus resisting turning. Therefore, spring washers are ineffective on left hand threads and hardened surfaces. Also, they are not to be used in conjunction with a flat washer under the spring washer, as this isolates the spring washer from biting into the component that will resist turning. The use and effectiveness of spring lock washers has been debated, with some publications advising against their use on the grounds that, when tight, the washer is flat against the substrate and gives no more resistance to rotation than a normal washer at the same torque. A 1990 NASA manual states "In summary, a lockwasher of this type is useless for locking." However, a spring washer will continue to hold the bolt against the substrate and maintain friction when loosened slightly, whereas a plain washer will not. The benefit of spring lock washers lies in the trapezoidal shape of the washer. When compressed to loads near the proof strength of the bolt, it will twist and flatten. This reduces the spring rate of the bolted joint which allows it to maintain more force under the same vibration levels. This prevents loosening.
Toothed lock washer, serrated washer or star washer	Toothed lock washer with external teeth Internal and external star washers	A washer with serrations that extend radially inward or outward to bite into the bearing surface. This type of washer is especially effective as a lock washer when used with a soft substrate, such as aluminium or plastic, and can resist rotation more than a plain washer on hard surfaces, as the tension between washer and the surface is applied over a much smaller area (the teeth). There are four types: internal, external, combination, and countersunk. The internal style has the serrations along the inner edge of the washer, which makes them more aesthetically pleasing. The external style has the serrations around the outer edge, which provides better holding power, because of the greater circumference. The combination style has serrations about both edges, for maximum holding power. The countersunk style is designed to be used with countersunk screws. Tooth lockwashers are also used for ground bonding where a metal lug or object must be electrically bonded to a surface. The teeth of the washer cut through surface oxides, paints or other finishes and provide a gas-tight conductive path. In these applications, the washer is not placed under the head of the screw (or under the nut), it is placed between the surfaces to be bonded.
Tab washer		A locking washer that works by having a side tab that can be bent into place against a nut. Metallic or non-metallic, the tab washer notch prevents rotation relative to the shaft or fastener. Variations include single, multiple, formed and flat.
Wedge lock washer		A hardened two-piece washer with radial teeth on the outside to grip both the fastener and mounting surface. The two halves of this washer form a wedge seam, which requires additional tension to be placed on the fastener in order for them to separate after tightening. While generally more expensive per piece, these washers provide the highest amount of vibrational loosening prevention.

Lock washers, locknuts, jam nuts, and thread-locking fluid are ways to prevent vibration from loosening a bolted joint.

=== Gaskets ===
The term washer is often applied to various gasket types such as those used to seal the control valve in taps.

Name	Image	Description
Shoulder washer		A plain washer type with integral cylindrical sleeve. Used as a barrier between differing metals and as a seal. This term is also used for electrically insulating grommets.
Crush washer		A washer made of soft metal such as aluminium or copper. Used to seal fluid or gas connections such as those found in hydraulic systems and in internal combustion engines.

=== Specialised types ===
Name(s)	Image	Description
Keps nut or K-lock nut		A nut with an integral free spinning washer; assembly is easier because the washer is captive.
Self-aligning washer		A two-part washer: one part has one convex spherical surface, which mates with a concave surface on the other part, to allow tightening to a surface which is not perpendicular to the axis of the screw or nut fastener, in a similar manner to a spherical washer and self-aligning nut
Top hat washer		A shoulder washer type used in plumbing for tap fitting.
Insulating shoulder washer		Used to electrically isolate a mounting screw from the surface it secures. Often made of nylon, these are also made of teflon, PEEK or other plastics to withstand higher temperatures.
Keyed washer		A washer with a key to prevent rotation, and is used to lock two nuts in place, without allowing the torque applied to the top nut to cause the bottom nut to also rotate (such as in a threaded headset on a bicycle).
Torque-limiting washer		A type of washer used in a variety of torque sensitive applications, designed to limit torque to a predetermined level and not beyond.
Dowty washer		Has a central rubber ring to provide a strong seal against high pressure liquid or gas.

The DIN 125 metric washer standard refers to subtypes A and B. ISO 7089 calls these Form A and ISO 7090 calls them Form B. They are all the same overall size, but Form B is chamfered on one side.

== Materials ==
Washers can be fabricated from a variety of materials including, but not limited to:

- Steel – Carbon steel, spring steel, A2 (304) stainless steel, and A4 (316/316L) stainless steel
- Non-ferrous metal – Copper, brass, aluminium, titanium, iron, bronze, and zinc
- Alloy – Silicon bronze, Inconel, Monel, and Hastelloy
- Plastic – Thermoplastics and thermosetting polymers such as polyethylene, PTFE (Teflon)
- Nylon – Nylon 6, Nylon 66, Nylatron, and Tecamid MDS
- Specialty – Fibers, ceramics, rubber, felt, leather, bimetals, and mica
- Phenolic – The material has good electrical insulation, is lightweight, tough, has low moisture absorption, is heat resistant, and is resistant to chemicals and corrosion. Phenolic washers are substitutes for flat metallic washers in cases where electrical insulation is required. Phenolic washers are stamped out of large sheets of the phenolic material. The term "phenolic washer" is sometimes used for stamped washers from laminated materials such as paper, canvas, and Mylar.

=== Corrosion resistance ===
A number of techniques are used to enhance the corrosion resistant properties of certain washer materials:

- Metallic coatings – Typical coatings used to produce corrosion resistant washers are zinc, cadmium, and nickel. Zinc coating acts as a sacrificial surface layer that falls victim to corrosive materials before the washer's material can be harmed. Cadmium produces a high-quality protective surface but is toxic, both biologically and environmentally. Nickel coatings add protection from corrosion only when the finish is dense and non-porous.
- Electroplating – This method involves coating the washer by electrolytic deposition using metals such as chromium or silver.
- Phosphating – A resilient, but abrasive surface is achieved by incorporating a zinc-phosphate layer and corrosion-protective oil.
- Browning or bluing – Exposing the washer (typically steel) to a chemical compound or alkali salt solution causes an oxidizing chemical reaction, which results in the creation of a corrosion-resistant, colored surface. The integrity of the coating can be improved by treating the finished product with a water-displacing oil.
- Chemical plating – This technique utilizes a nickel-phosphor alloy that is precipitated onto the washer surface, creating an extremely corrosion- and abrasive-resistant surface.

== Type and form ==
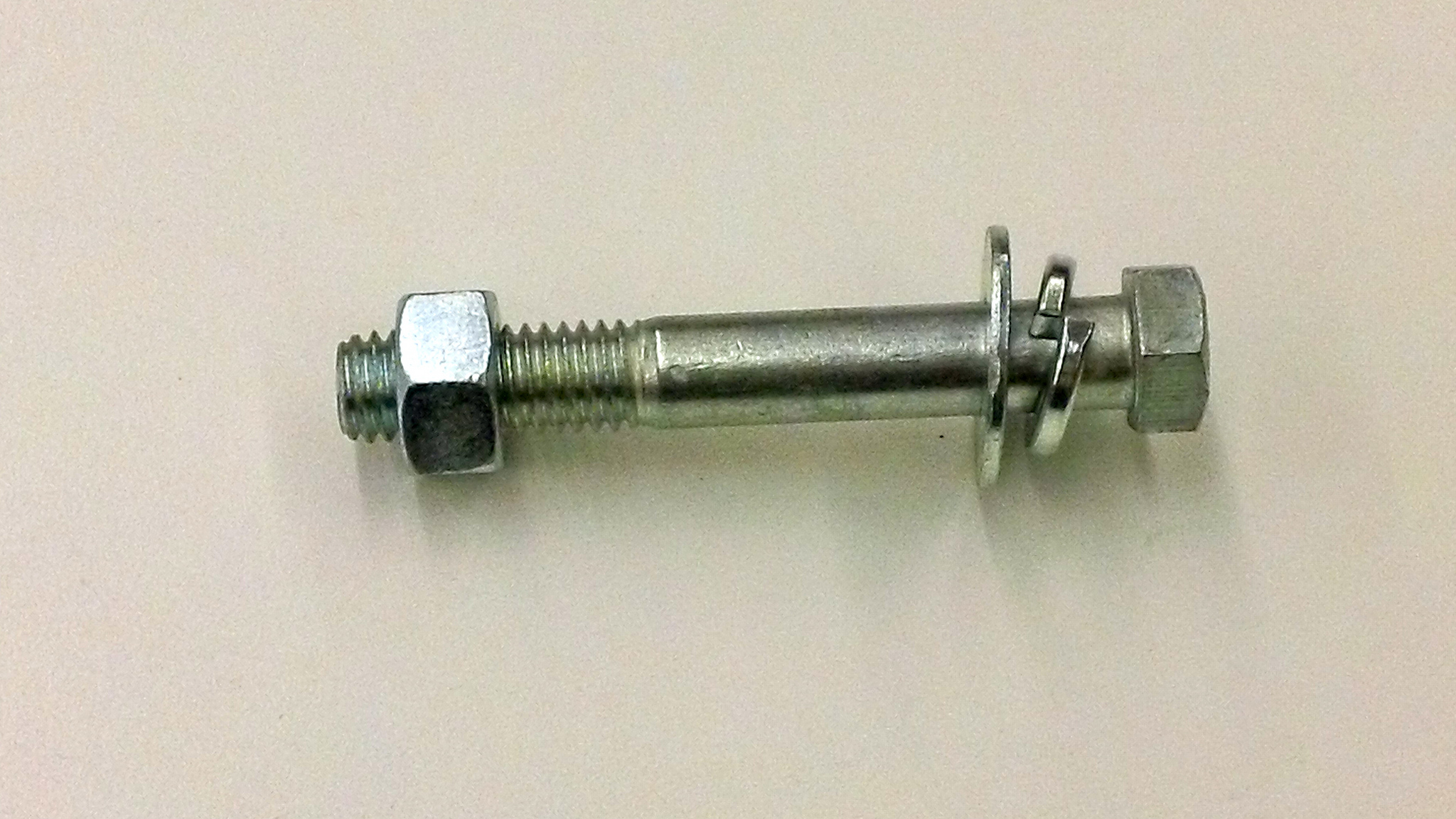
A plain washer and a spring washer are placed on a bolt between the nut (on the threaded end) and the bolt head.

The American National Standards Institute (ANSI) provides standards for general use flat washers. Type A is a series of steel washers at broad tolerances, where precision is not critical. Type B is a series of flat washers with tighter tolerances where outside diameters are categorized as "narrow", "regular" or "wide" for specific bolt sizes.

"Type" is not to be confused with "form" (but often is). The British Standard for Metric Series Metal Washers (BS4320), written in 1968, coined the term "form". The forms go from A to G and dictate the outside diameter and thickness of the flat washers.

- Form A: Normal diameter, normal thickness
- Form B: Normal diameter, light thickness
- Form C: Large diameter, normal thickness
- Form D: Large diameter, light thickness
- Form E: Normal diameter, normal thickness
- Form F: Large diameter, normal thickness
- Form G: Largest diameter, larger thickness.
  Washer 'form' when comparing different washer material types is used quite freely by stockists. In relation to BS4320 specifically, washer forms 'A' to 'D' inclusive are designated 'bright metal' washers and are supplied self-finished in various metals including: steel alloys, brass, copper, etc. Whereas, BS4320 washer forms 'E' to 'G' inclusive are designated 'black' (uncoated) mild steel washers, which normally are specified with a supplementary protective coating supply condition.

== Standard metric flat washers sizes ==
Washers of standard metric sizes equivalent to BS4320 Form A are listed in the table below. Measurements in the table refer to the dimensions of the washers as described by the drawing. Specifications for standard metric flat washers were known as DIN 125 (withdrawn) and replaced with ISO 7089. DIN (Deutsches Institut für Normung - German Institute for Standardization) standards are issued for a variety of components including industrial fasteners as Metric DIN 125 Flat Washers. The DIN standards remain common in Germany, Europe and globally even though the transition to ISO standards is taking place. DIN standards continue to be used for parts which do not have ISO equivalents or for which there is no need for standardization.

Nominal screw sizes, M (mm)		Screw pitch thread, P (mm)		Diameter (mm)		Thickness, H (mm)
1st choice	2nd choice	Coarse	Fine	Internal hole, d_{1}	External, d_{2}	Thickness, H (mm)
1		0.25		1.1	3	0.3
1.2		0.25		1.3	3.5	0.3
	1.4	0.3		1.5	4	0.3
1.6		0.35		1.7	4	0.3
	1.7			1.8	4.5	0.3
	1.8	0.35				
2		0.4		2.2	5	0.3
2.5		0.45		2.7	6	0.5
	2.6			2.8	7	0.5
3		0.5		3.2	7	0.5
	3.5	0.6		3.7	8	0.5
4		0.7		4.3	9	0.8
5		0.8		5.3	10	1
6		1	0.75	6.4	12	1.6
	7	1		7.4	14	1.6
8		1.25	1	8.4	16	1.6
10		1.5	1.25 or 1	10.5	20	2
12		1.75	1.5 or 1.25	13	24	2.5
	14	2	1.5	15	28	2.5
16		2	1.5	17	30	3
	18	2.5	2 or 1.5	19	34	3
20		2.5	2 or 1.5	21	37	3
	22	2.5	2 or 1.5	23	39	3
24		3	2	25	44	4
	27	3	2	28	50	4
30		3.5	2	31	56	4
	33	3.5	2	34	60	5
36		4	3	37	66	5
	39	4	3	40	72	6
42		4.5	3	43	78	7
	45	4.5	3	46	85	7
48		5	3	50	92	8
	52	5	4	54	98	8
56		5.5	4	58	105	9
	60	5.5	4	62	110	9
64		6	4	66	115	9
	68			70	120	10
72				74	125	10
	76			78	135	10
80				82	140	12
	85			87	145	12
90				93	160	12
	100			104	175	14

== See also ==
- Bit guard
- Dowel
- Unified Thread Standard
