= Nyloc nut =

Type of lock nut

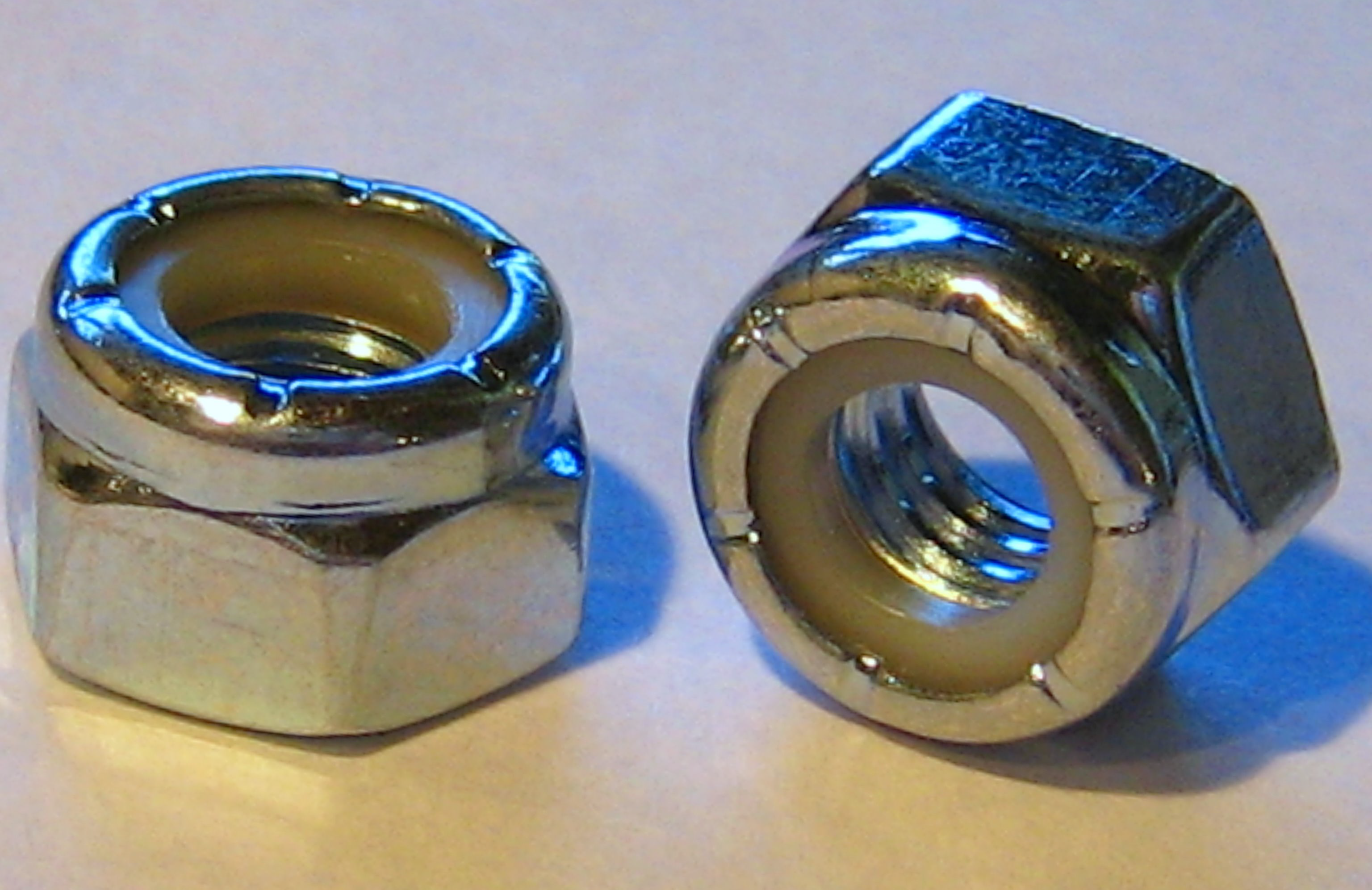
Nyloc nut

A nyloc nut, also referred to as a nylon-insert lock nut, polymer-insert lock nut, or elastic stop nut, is a kind of locknut with a nylon collar that increases friction on the screw thread.

The nylon collar insert is placed at the end of the nut, with an inner diameter (ID) slightly smaller than the major diameter of the screw. The screw thread does not cut into the nylon insert; rather, the insert deforms elastically over the threads as tightening pressure is applied. The insert locks the nut against the screw as a result of friction, caused by the radial compressive force resulting from the deformation of the nylon. Nyloc nuts retain their locking ability up to 250 °F (121 °C).

== Trademark ==
There are no registered trademarks filed in the United States for "Nyloc" or "Nylock" that are currently active in regards to fasteners. In Australia, "nyloc" is a registered trademark.

== Related fasteners ==
A nylon pellet nut is very similar to a nyloc nut except that it uses one or more smaller nylon inserts instead of a ring of nylon. They do not lock as strongly as nyloc nuts.

== Reuse ==
Authorities disagree on whether nyloc nuts should be reused. For example, Carroll Smith (Carroll Smith's Nuts, Bolts, Fasteners, and Plumbing Handbook) notes that the nylon insert is not damaged by installation and therefore they can be reused many times, and a Federal Aviation Administration Advisory Circular allows nuts to be reused if the prevailing torque is within specification. However, a United States Air Force Technical Order requires replacement of self-locking nuts in critical areas. Various specifications for aerospace-grade self-locking nuts require that the running torque be maintained after a number of cycles of assembly, but without preloading the fastener.

== See also ==
- Mechanical joint
