= Drywall anchor =

Insert for creating a mount point on walls

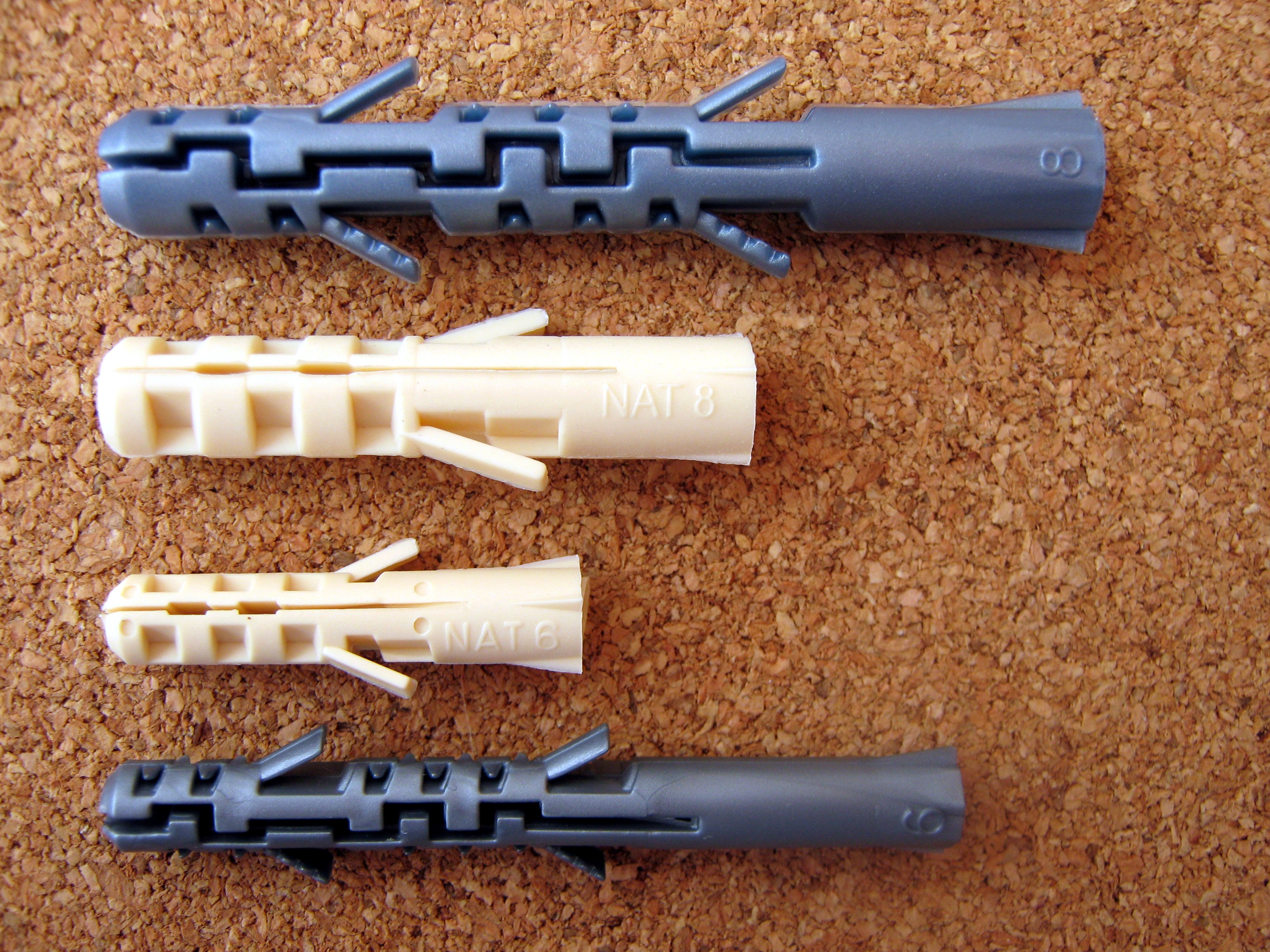
Expandable wall anchors with toggle arms

A drywall anchor, also known as a wall anchor, is an insert that, combined with the appropriate screw, can create a mounting point anywhere on a drywall panel or similar hollow wall. A drywall anchor goes between the screw and the drywall, gripping the drywall much more effectively than a screw would. Some have toggle arms that either drop behind the wall or expand within the cavity. Others include wide threads that carve out grooves in the wallboard to create resistance against tension forces when tightened. All drywall anchors are designed to create a mounting point in a substrate that cannot support a screw or other fastener by itself by distributing the applied load over an increased surface area.

Drywall anchors are specifically used when creating a mounting point that does not have a wall stud behind it.

Common forms of drywall anchor include expandable plastic wall plugs and metal (molly bolts), WallClaw anchors, toggle bolts, and self-drilling drywall anchors.

Drywall Anchor Performance and Substrate Matrix
Anchor Type	Common Material	Typical Tension Strength (Pull-out)	Typical Shear Strength (Downward load)	Primary Substrates and Common Use Cases
Plastic expansion anchor	Plastic / Nylon	10 to 20 lb (4.5 to 9.1 kg)	20 to 30 lb (9.1 to 13.6 kg)	Drywall, plaster, concrete, brick; intended for lightweight items.
Self-drilling / threaded anchor	Zinc alloy or plastic	25 to 50 lb (11 to 23 kg)	40 to 75 lb (18 to 34 kg)	Drywall, gypsum board; medium-weight fixtures without pre-drilling.
Toggle bolt	Steel / Zinc-plated steel	50 to 150 lb (23 to 68 kg)	75 to 250 lb (34 to 113 kg)	Drywall, plaster, hollow block; heavy items and ceilings.
Strap toggle	Plastic strap, steel channel	80 to 265 lb (36 to 120 kg)	100 to 356 lb (45 to 161 kg)	Drywall, hollow concrete block; heavy-duty and allows bolt removal.
Molly bolt	Zinc-plated steel	25 to 50 lb (11 to 23 kg)	40 to 80 lb (18 to 36 kg)	Drywall, plaster; medium to heavy fixtures.
Concrete screw (e.g., Tapcon)	Carbon steel or stainless steel	300 to 600 lb (140 to 270 kg)	400 to 900 lb (180 to 410 kg)	Concrete, brick, cinder block; direct masonry anchoring only.
Hammer-driven anchor	Carbon steel or zinc alloy	15 to 30 lb (6.8 to 13.6 kg)	30 to 50 lb (14 to 23 kg)	Drywall, drywall over wood or metal studs; high-speed installation.
Tapered universal anchor	High-strength polymer	30 to 60 lb (14 to 27 kg)	50 to 90 lb (23 to 41 kg)	Drywall, concrete, hollow brick, ceramic tile; versatile substrate use.
Spring toggle anchor	Zinc-plated steel	40 to 90 lb (18 to 41 kg)	60 to 120 lb (27 to 54 kg)	Drywall, hollow ceilings, plaster; heavy overhead lighting fixtures.
Winged plastic anchor	Nylon / Plastic	20 to 35 lb (9.1 to 15.9 kg)	30 to 60 lb (14 to 27 kg)	Drywall, hollow doors, plaster; light-to-medium duty.

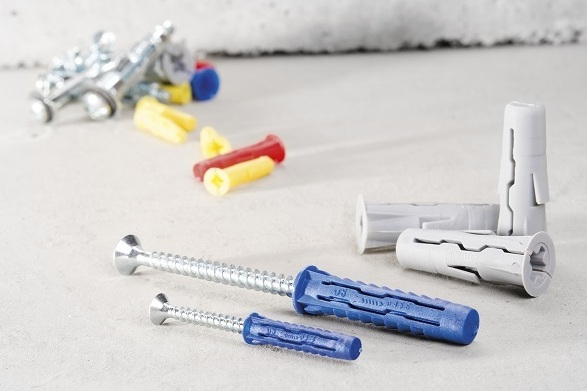
Plastic wall plugs

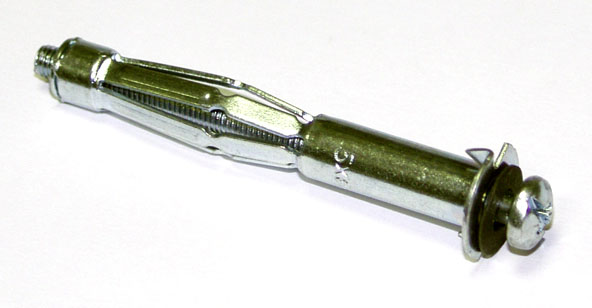
Expandable metal Molly bolt

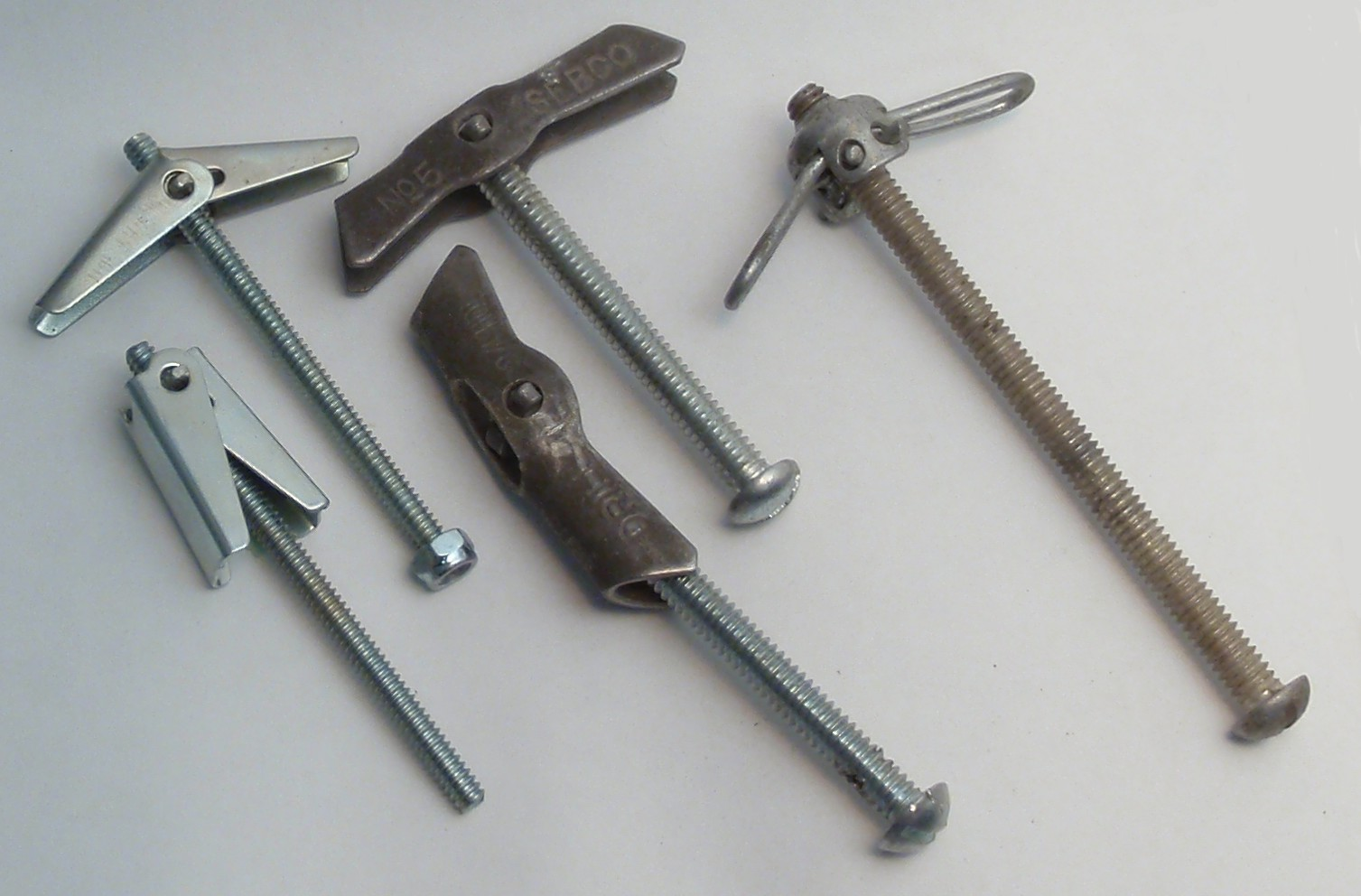
Toggle bolt

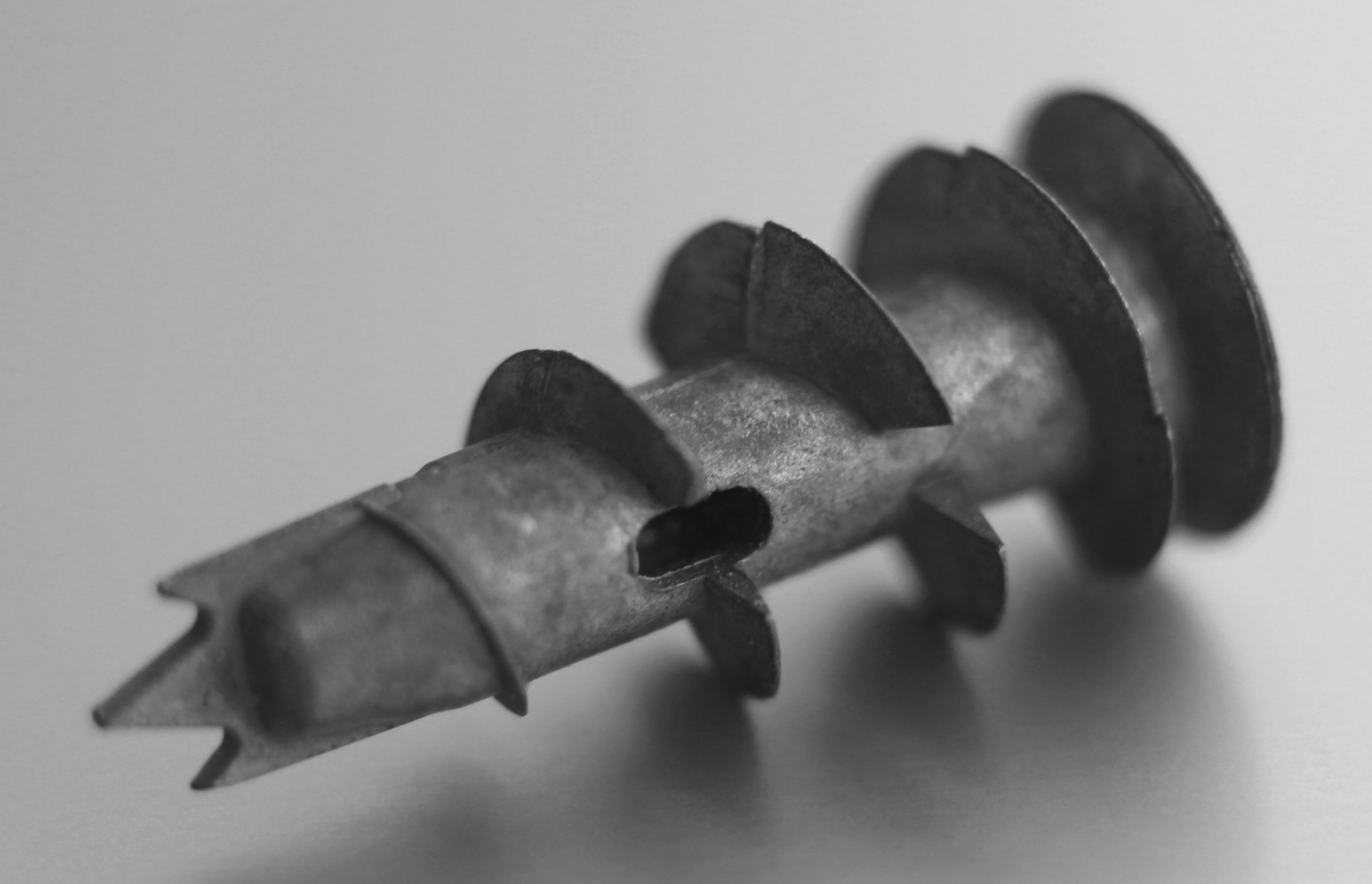
Self-drilling wall anchor

== See also ==
- Toggle bolt
- Molly (fastener)
- Rawlplug
- Wall plug
