= Wall stud =

Component of a building's wall

A typical wall section in platform framing: 1. Cripple; 2. Window header; 3. Top plate / upper wall plate; 4. Window sill; 5. Stud; 6. Sill plate / sole plate / bottom plate

Wall studs are framing components in timber or steel-framed walls, that run between the top and bottom plates. Studs are a fundamental element in frame building. The majority of non-masonry buildings rely on wall studs, with wood being the most common and least expensive material used for studs. Studs are positioned perpendicular to the wall they are forming to give strength and create space for wires, pipes and insulation. Studs are sandwiched between two horizontal boards called top and bottom plates. These boards are nailed or screwed to the top and bottom ends of the studs, forming the complete wall frame. Studs are usually spaced 16 or 24 inches (410 or 610 mm) apart.

== Etymology ==
Stud is an ancient word related to similar words in Old English, Old Norse, Middle High German, and Old Teutonic generally meaning prop or support. Other historical words with similar meaning are quarter and scantling (one sense meaning a smaller timber, not necessarily the same use). Stick is a colloquial term for both framing lumber (timber) and a "timber tree" (a tree trunk good for using as lumber (timber)); thus, the names "stick and platform", "stick and frame", "stick and box", or simply stick framing. The stud height usually determines the ceiling height, thus sayings like: "...These rooms were usually high in stud..."

== Purpose ==
Studs form walls and may carry vertical structural loads or be non load-bearing, such as in partition walls, which only separate spaces. They hold in place the windows, doors, interior finish, exterior sheathing or siding, insulation and utilities and help give shape to a building. Studs run from sill plate to wall plate. In modern construction, studs are anchored to the plates in a way, such as using fasteners, to prevent the building from being lifted off the foundation by severe wind or earthquake.

== Properties ==
Studs are usually slender, so more studs are needed than in post and beam framing. Sometimes studs are long, as in balloon framing, where the studs extend two stories and carry a ledger which carries joists. Balloon framing has been made illegal in new construction in many jurisdictions for fire safety reasons because the open wall cavities allow fire to quickly spread such as from a basement to an attic; the plates and platforms in platform framing provide a passive fire stop inside the walls, and so are deemed much safer by fire safety officials. Being thinner and lighter, stick construction techniques are easier to cut and carry and is speedier than the timber framing.

The wood needs to be dry when used, or problems may occur as the studs shrink and twist as they dry out.

=== Spacing ===
Spacing of the studs is typically done so that they are placed at regular intervals along the wall, and carry the vertical loads from the overlying structures. In Norway and many other parts of Europe, wall studs are typically placed with center-to-center (cc) distances of 600 mm (or alternatively 450 mm) since this corresponds to standardised sheet widths for drywall, plywood and other construction materials of 1200 mm (or alternatively 900 mm). In the United States and Canada, studs are usually placed 16 inches (410 mm) from each other's center, but sometimes also at 12 or 24 inches (300 or 610 mm).

=== Wood studs ===
Studs are usually made of wood, and besides bearing the load of the building, also provide simple and secure attachment points for hanging interior such as cabinetry and shelves using large wood screws. In the United States and Canada studs are usually 2 by 4 inches (51 mm × 102 mm) or 2 by 6 inches (51 mm × 152 mm) by name; however, these historical dimensions have been reduced but still carry the name of "two by four" and "two by six", which is a misnomer. Typical dimensions of today's "two by four" is 1.5 by 3.5 inches (38 mm × 89 mm) dimensional lumber prior to sanding.

In New Zealand, the required lumber size and spacing of wall studs are determined using NZS 3604 Timber-framed buildings table 8.2 for loadbearing walls and table 8.4 for non-loadbearing walls.

=== Steel studs ===
Steel studs are gaining popularity as a non-combustible alternative, especially for non load-bearing walls, and are required in some firewalls. Steel studs are more challenging in regards to attaching screws for securely hanging heavy objects from the wall. While wooden studs can be securely attached onto using large wood screws, steel studs require, for example, use of rivet nuts, or wall anchors in the form of toggle bolts, self-drilling plugs or expandable anchors similar to those used for drywalls.

== Other terms ==
The studs used to frame around window and door openings are sometimes given different names, including:

- king stud − stud to left or right of a window or door that is continuous from the bottom plate to the top plate
- queen stud - stud used as a repetitive member that is angled so as to be neither vertical nor horizontal.
- trimmer or jack − stud to the left or right of a window or door that runs from the bottom plate to the underside of a lintel or header
- cripple stud – a stud located either above or below a framed opening, that does not run the full height of the wall
- post or column − a doubled or other integral multiple of a group of studs nailed side by side. Posts in walls are used at point loads such as long spans near a wide window or sliding door, etc.
- sleeper or nailer - a stud laid flat to other framing members to provide a point of attachment.
- sill - a stud sized member forming the base of a window assembly or the base of wall.
- mudsill - a stud sized member that forms the base of a wall and has been treated against insects and decay.
- top plate or double top plate - a stud sized member that forms the top of the wall. In cases where other members must bear or brace on the top of the wall a double top plate is used with the member using offset laps so the top plate provides a continuous bearing surface.

A building technique mostly associated with Lincolnshire, England, and parts of Scotland gets part of its name from the studs: mud and stud (stud and mud). This building method uses studs in a framework which is then totally covered with mud which resembles the building material cob. Another traditional building method is called stud and plaster where the plaster walls are held by lath on the studs. Studs are also the namesake of a type of timber framing called close studding.

== Grades ==
Based on the American West Coast Lumber Inspection Bureau (WCLIB) grading rules, there is only one grade of stud: STUD. A stud is graded for vertical application and its stress requirements and allowable visual defects reflect that application. A stud is most similar to a No. 2 grade, which is held to a higher standard during grading. The biggest difference between the two is the frequency, placement and size of knots and overall allowable wane.

== See also ==
- Furring
- Stud finder
