= Toggle =

Toggle may refer to:

- Toggle mechanism
- Toggle switch
- Toggling harpoon, an ancient weapon and tool used in whaling to impale a whale when thrown
- A type of textile closure, like an elongated button
- Toggle (Doonesbury character), a character in the comic strip Doonesbury
- Feature toggle, a technique in software development
- Cordlock toggle, for stopping a cord or drawstring.
- Toggle ropes, a piece of military equipment
- Toggle bolt, a type of fastener
- Toggle (website), a Singaporean entertainment website and OTT service since renamed to meWATCH
