= Wall plug =

Insert for screws

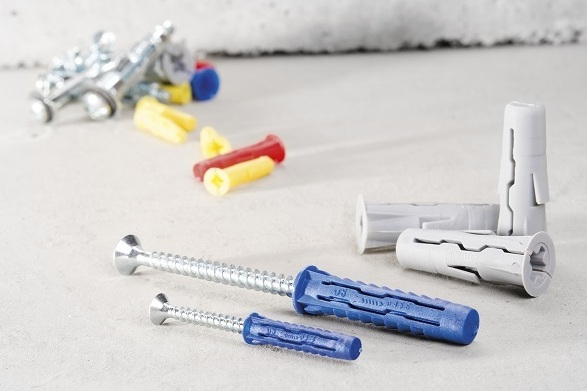
Plastic wall plugs

A wall plug (UK English) also known as an anchor (US) or rawlplug (UK), is a fibre or plastic (originally wood) insert used to enable the attachment of a screw in a material that is porous or brittle, or that would otherwise not support the weight of the object attached with the screw. It is a type of anchor that can be used to allow screws to be fitted into masonry walls. In US English, mentions of drywall anchors are sometimes meant (and taken) to refer specifically to the type of plastic wall plugs with expandable wings for hollow walls, in contradistinction with mollies and toggle bolts.

There are many forms of wall plug, but the most common principle is to use a tapered tube of soft material, such as plastic. This is inserted loosely into a drilled hole, then a screw is tightened into the centre. As the screw enters the plug, the soft material of the plug expands conforming tightly to the wall material. Such anchors can aid in the attachment of one object to another in situations where screws alone, nails, adhesives, or other simple fasteners are either impractical or ineffective. Different types have different levels of strength, and can be used on different types of surfaces.

== History ==
Before commercial wall plugs, fixings were made to brick or masonry walls by first chiselling a groove into a soft mortar joint, hammering in a crude wooden plug, and then attaching it to the wooden plug. This was time consuming and required a large hole, thus more patching of the wall afterward. It also limited the holes' location to the mortar joints.

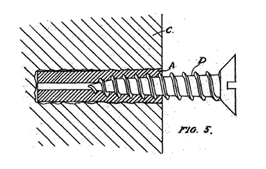
Diagram from Rawlings' 1911 patent

The original wall plug was invented by John Joseph Rawlings in 1911, and marketed under the name Rawlplug. These plugs became popular after the First World War, when the demand for retrofitting existing buildings with new electric lighting coincided with a shortage of labour, encouraging many new labour-saving innovations in the building trade. Rawlplug gained prominence from its adoption in the British Museum.

Early wall plugs were thick-walled fibre tubes made of parallel strings bonded with glue. The Rawlings brothers conducted thousands of trials using many diverse materials in their search for the perfect plug. Among the many solutions tested were plugs made of lead, zinc, natural and synthetic rubber, hemp fibres, glass, wood, and paper. They imported Indian jute as it possessed natural resistance to the effects of humidity and for particularly damp conditions they developed a range of white bronze plugs.

Most current brands are plastic, first designed shortly after the Second World War by the German Fritz Axthelm. In 1957, Oswald Thorsman from Sweden received a patent for a plastic wall plug; around the same time, German inventor Artur Fischer created the plastic Fischer wall plug. The Fischer wall plug, due to its innovative shape, was the first to be suitable for all wall types, and has since been the most produced and sold wall plug worldwide.

Other varieties of wall plugs are mechanical anchors for heavy duty loads and hollow wall fixings for fixing to plasterboard. The first mechanical anchor, the Rawlbolt, was designed in the 1930s by the Rawlplug company and the first fixing for hollow walls was the Toggle Bolt, which was also designed by Rawlplug in 1941.

== Split-ribbed anchor ==
Animation of a wall plug. (US: split-ribbed plastic anchor or conical anchor)

Nowadays, one of the most common designs for light loads is the split-ribbed plastic anchor. It consists of two halves that increase their separation (split) as the screw penetrates between them. As its name suggests, this type of anchor also has ribs on the outside to prevent the anchor from slipping out of the hole as the screw is driven in. This type of anchor is also known as a conical screw anchor.

== Fibre and resin mixes ==
On crumbling walls it may be difficult to drill a clean hole, or the force of the expanding plug may be enough to cause cracking. In these cases, a hardening liquid or putty mixture may be used instead.

One of the first of these mixtures was produced by Rawlplug and was composed of dry white asbestos fibres, sold loose in a tin. The user wetted some into a ball (usually by spitting on them) and pushed this plug of putty into the hole. A small tamper and spike was supplied with the kit. This putty worked very well, but the hazard of the asbestos fibres means that the product is no longer available. However, another way to fix wall plugs is accomplished by the application of a cotton woven pad which has been impregnated with a special formulated gypsum to bond into the wall. The pad is wetted and wrapped around the wall plug, and the two are inserted into the hole; after a short time it hardens and a strong bond is achieved and the wall fitting can be applied. It is used in combination with wall plugs in masonry, ceramic, wood and plasterboard walls.

Modern resin mixtures are based on polyester resins. Apart from their use in construction, they're also used in climbing.

== See also ==
- Well nut
