= Bonded expansion anchor =

Post-installed high-performance fastener for reinforced concrete

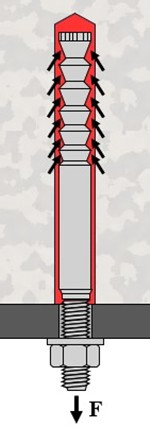
Composite expansion anchor, system consisting of a specially shaped steel element and a two-component mortar (F is the force that is introduced into the concrete via the anchor)

Patented in 1997 by the company MKT, bonded expansion anchors are post-installed into reinforced concrete elements, i.e. into hardened concrete, for fastening structural or non-structural components.

Bonded expansion anchors consist of a specially shaped steel element—the conical anchor rod—and a two-component adhesive with which the anchor rod is bonded into a hole pre-drilled into the concrete. The end of the steel element protruding from the concrete is furnished with a thread to attach the component using a nut and washer, clamping against the concrete surface. The hardened mortar seals the drill hole and thus prevents the ingress of water. During installation, the bond between the anchor rod and the mortar is intentionally released; only then the bonded expansion anchor develops its intended functional behavior. The release of the bond is facilitated by a smooth surface of the steel element. When the anchor is then loaded, the load is transferred into the concrete via the mechanical interlock created by the conical geometry of the anchor rod engaging with the hardened mortar. At the same time, radial expansion enables particularly high load capacities. This functional principle distinguishes the bonded expansion anchor from a conventional bonded anchor, which transfers load solely by adhesion between the bonded surfaces.

== Types and suitability ==
Depending on the application and environmental conditions (e.g. corrosive environments), anchor rods made of electro-galvanized steel, hot-dip galvanized steel, or stainless steel are used. Due to the complex geometry, the steel element is manufactured by machining; cold forming is generally not feasible.

Due to their design, bonded expansion anchors can safely transfer not only static loads, but also seismic loads (i.e. loads resulting from earthquakes) and dynamic loads (i.e. fatigue-relevant loading). Depending on the radiation resistance of the used mortar, bonded expansion anchors may also be suitable for installation in nuclear facilities. Because of their technical complexity and high performance, bonded expansion anchors are regarded as the pinnacle of concrete anchor types.

== History ==
Common types of anchors for solid substrates such as masonry, synonymously referred to as fasteners, were already developed in their basic form in the 19th century. The wall plug patented in 1911 by the Rawlings brothers is considered the first industrially manufactured anchor. Bonded anchors based on two-component adhesives entered the construction industry in the 1970s. However, the first fully functional bonded expansion anchor was not developed until the 1990s. From a technical perspective, it represents a hybrid solution combining elements of mechanical anchors with those of chemical anchors.

The development of fastening technology for applications in concrete gained momentum with the increasing use of concrete as a versatile construction material and the associated development of high-performing power drills and hard-metal drill bits. Since the anchoring points required later are often not defined at the time of concreting, anchors cannot be cast in place. Post-installed anchors, i.e. fasteners installed into boreholes, provide the necessary flexibility. In the case of redesigns and retrofits, post-installed anchor systems often represent the only feasible solution.

Chemical anchor systems, such as bonded threaded rods, offer advantages including high flexibility, sealing of the drill hole, and low expansion forces, which allow installation in narrow concrete members or close to edges. For a long time, however, their load capacity, particularly under sustained loading, did not match that of mechanical anchor systems, such as undercut anchors.

To provide a high-performance bonded anchor for demanding applications, the company Metall-Kunststoff-Technik (MKT) developed the bonded expansion anchor, which combines the advantages of chemical anchoring with those of mechanical anchoring. Depending on the anchorage depth and diameter, the anchor rod features three to five cones along the bonded section. It is bonded using a special mortar that readily releases from the anchor rod once the rod is twisted during the application of the installation torque. Other manufacturers followed with their own developments of bonded expansion anchor systems. Alongside companies such as Ejot, Allfa, Chemofast, and Toge (both part of the Würth Group), MKT is among the manufacturers of anchor systems that still produce in Germany.

== Regulations ==
In Europe, bonded expansion anchors are subject to the Construction Products Regulation and are qualified according to EAD 330499-XX-0601 and designed according to with EN 1992-4. In the United States, the anchoring system is qualified according to AC308 and designed according to ACI 318. The product qualification of bonded expansion anchors therefore largely follows the regulations for chemical anchors. Unlike conventional bonded anchors, however, no bond strength is approved as a product-specific parameter; instead, as with mechanical anchors, a pull-out load value is approved. In Europe, qualification is certified by a European Technical Assessment (ETA), while in the United States, it is certified by an Evaluation Service Report (ESR).

The regulatory framework for the engineering design of composite expansion anchors in Europe and the United States is nearly identical. In countries that align their concrete anchor regulations with the European framework (e.g. Malaysia, Singapore, Australia), ETAs are accepted. In countries that align with the U.S. regulatory framework (e.g. Canada, Mexico, Indonesia, South Korea, Taiwan, New Zealand), ESRs are primarily accepted and referenced; however, outside North America, ETAs are increasingly being accepted as well.

== Applications ==
Bonded expansion anchors are used, for example, to anchor industrial robots, crane runway rails, elevator guide rails, supply lines, high-traffic doors, and other heavily loaded components, such as those found in plant engineering and power plant construction. Depending on the requirements, suitable bonded expansion anchors with varying performance characteristics in terms of load capacity, fire protection, and corrosion protection [6] are available for a wide range of structures.

== See also ==
- R. Eligehausen, and R. Mallée. Befestigungstechnik im Beton- und Mauerwerksbau. Ernst & Sohn, Berlin 2000.
- R. Mallée, W. Fuchs, and R. Eligehausen. Befestigungstechnik. Beton-Kalender 2012, Part 2, 93–173, Ernst & Sohn, Berlin 2012.
- E. Eligehausen, R. Mallée, and J. Silva. Anchorage in concrete construction. Ernst & Sohn, Berlin 2006.
- IFI Book of Fastener Standards, 2024 (12th) Edition https://indfast.org/product/ifi-book-of-fastener-standards-2024-12th-edition-first-printing/
