= Façade engineering =

Art and science of designing effective enclosures for buildings

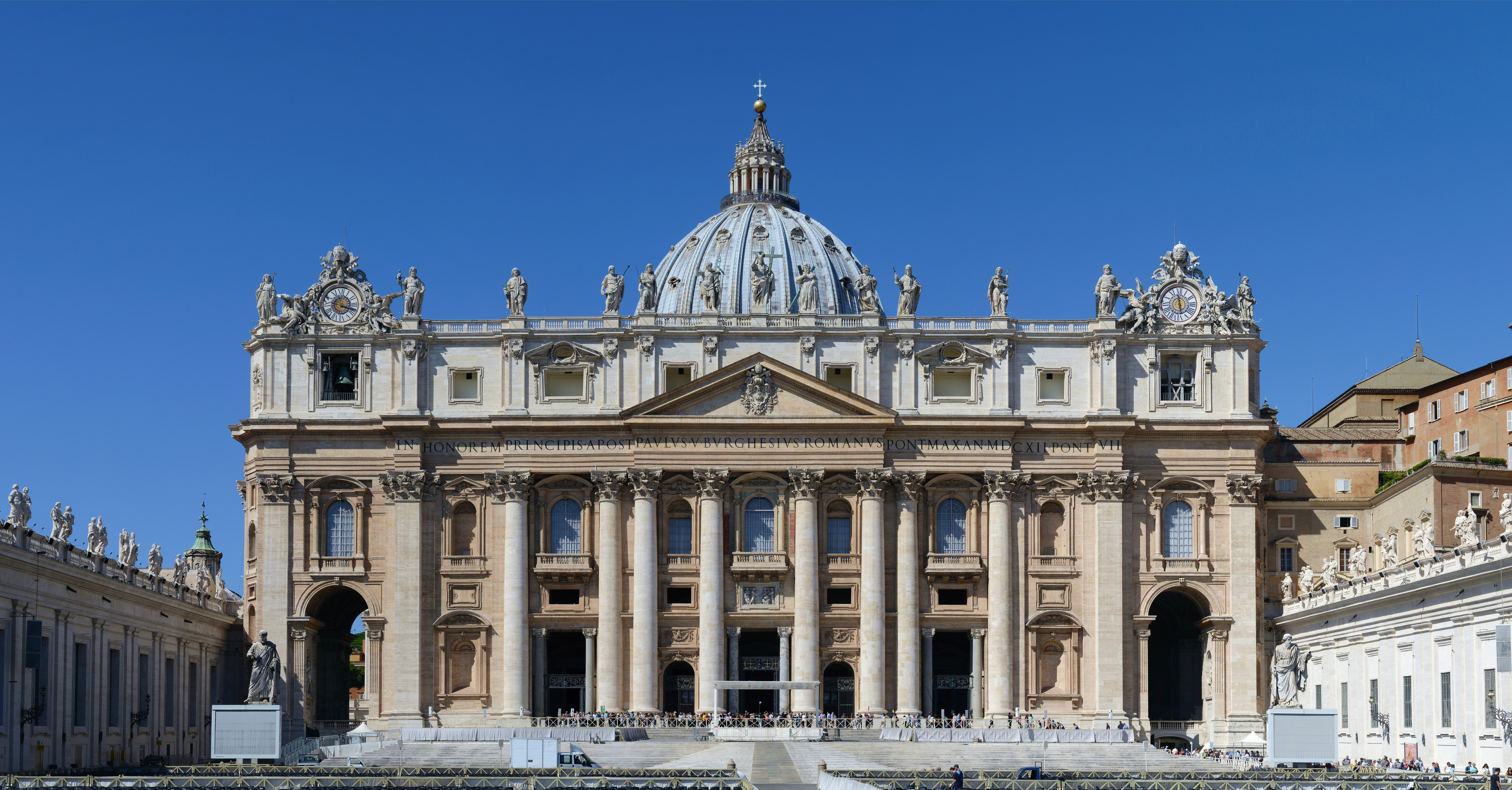
Carlo Maderno's monumental façade of St. Peter's Basilica in Vatican City

Façade engineering is the art and science of resolving aesthetic, environmental and structural issues to achieve the effective enclosure of buildings. Building façades are one of the largest, most important elements in the overall aesthetic and technical performance of a building.

Building façades are considered to be one of the most expensive and potentially the highest risk element of any major project. Historically building facades have the greatest level of failure of any part of a building fabric and the pressure for change and adaptation due to environmental and energy performance needs is greater than any other element of a building. As a consequence façade engineering has become a science in its own right.

Specialist companies are dedicated to this niche sector of the building industry and engineers operate within technical divisions of façade manufacturing companies. Generally, façade engineers are specifically qualified in the discipline of façade engineering and consultants work with the design team on construction projects for architects, building owners, construction managers and product manufacturers.

== Considerations and skills ==
Façade engineers must consider aspects such as the design, certification, fabrication and installation of the building façades with regards to the performance of materials, aesthetic appearance, structural behaviour, weathertightness, safety and serviceability, security, maintenance and build ability. The skill set will include matters such as computational fluid dynamics, heat transfer through two- and three-dimensional constructions, the behaviour of materials, manufacturing methodologies, structural engineering and logistics.

Over time, the specialist skills necessary in this niche sector have surpassed the capabilities of architects, structural and mechanical engineers as buildings are designed with more complexity and with the introduction of Building Information Modelling (BIM).

In the United Kingdom, a professional body associated with the industry is the Society of Façade Engineering. Qualifications in façade engineering recognised by the Society of Façade Engineering and international professional qualifications include the MSc in façade engineering. This may be from the University of Bath; Technical University Delft or Detmolder Schule fur Architektur und Innenarchitekter Hochschule or other qualifications subject to review by the Membership panel.
