= John Joseph Rawlings =

British engineer

John Joseph Rawlings (1 June 1860 – 4 August 1942) was a British mechanical engineer and inventor of the wall plug, also known from his name as the rawlplug. He was the founder of the Rawlplug manufacturing company.

== Biography ==
Rawlings was born in 1860 in Southfields, Wandsworth, London, the eldest son of carman John Rawlings and Sarah Payne. He worked as a whitesmith and later a mechanical engineer. In 1896, he married Millicent Dale, with whom he had a son, Ralph John Rawlings, and daughter, Kathleen Millicent. He retired to Wimbledon, where he died in 1942.

== Rawlplug ==
Rawlings invented the wall plug around 1910–11, registered a patent in 1911, trademarked the "rawlplug" name in 1912 and was granted the patent in 1913. In 1919, his company, formerly known as the Rawlings Brothers, was renamed to Rawlplug Ltd. The factory was in Mill Hill, London.

The original device was a jute fibre cylinder inserted into a hole drilled in the masonry and into which the screw was inserted. The deeper the screw penetrated, the more the fibre expanded and the greater the grip against the masonry. The jute was replaced by a thermoplastic plug in the 1960s, injection moulded singly, or in multiples attached together by the original sprue. Each plug can be easily twisted off the sprue when needed.

The company went on to develop the Rawlbolt, a fitting with similar function but much greater size and strength.

John Joseph's story was referenced in the Half Man Half Biscuit song "Rawlplugs of Yesteryear" (2025).
