= Well nut =

Threaded fastener

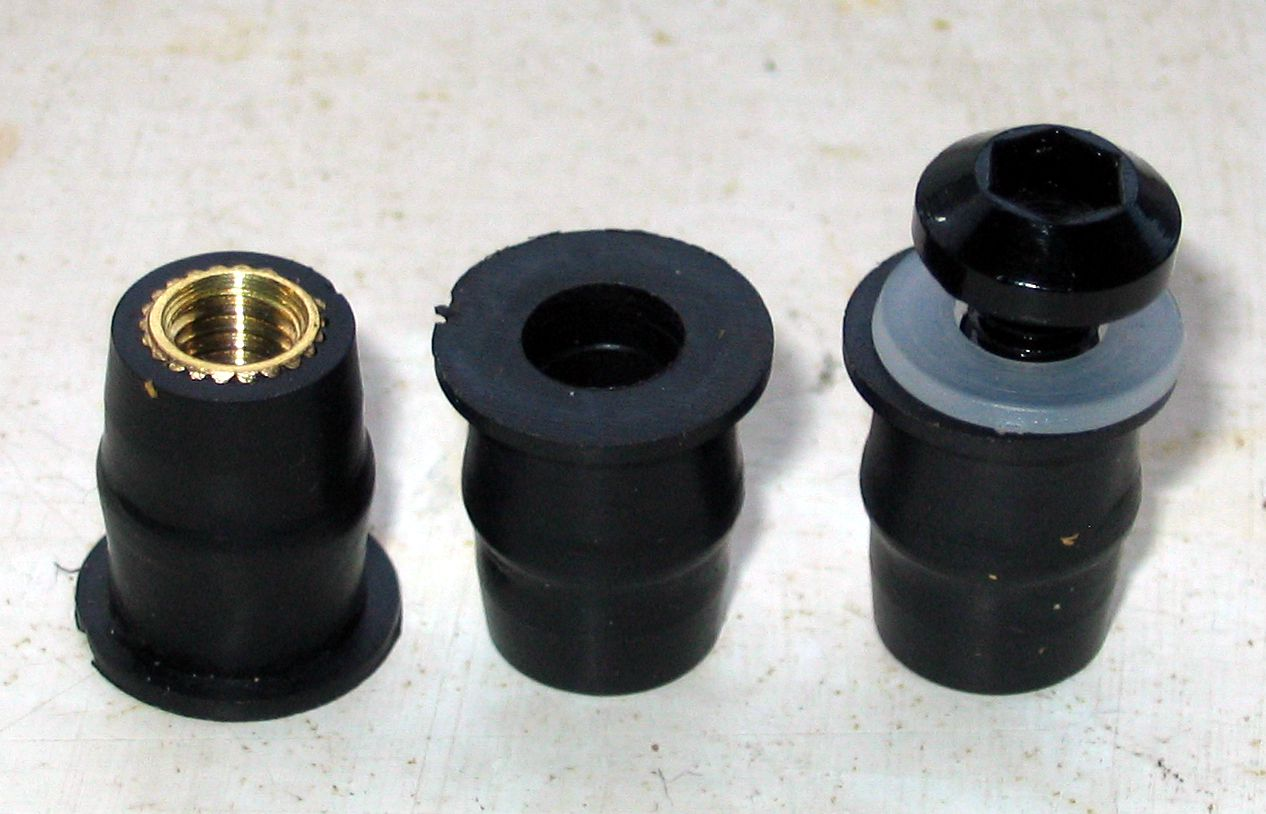
Three well nuts

A well nut is a blind rivet-like type of fastener used to blindly fasten a piece (much like a molly bolt) and to seal the bolt hole.

They are often referred to by the proprietary name Rawlnut or Rawl nut, the name by which they are known in the UK.

== Description ==
A well nut consists of a flanged neoprene bushing with a nut embedded in the non-flanged end. The bolt is passed through one of the pieces to be fastened and threaded onto the nut from the flanged end. The non-flanged end is then inserted through the other piece to be fastened. As the bolt is tightened, friction from the neoprene flange against the piece being fastened prevents the nut from turning. The bushing is compressed by the nut, forming a lip behind the piece being fastened, which compresses the fastened piece and seals the bolt hole. It can also be used in a solid workpiece. As the bolt draws the embedded nut towards it, the walls of the well exert a force on the hole walls, anchoring it.

Well nuts are not particularly strong, but are useful for sealing holes and/or isolating vibrations.

== History ==
The well nut was originally developed by the United Shoe Machinery Corporation (USMC).
