= Molly (fastener) =

Fastener providing an expandable metal anchor

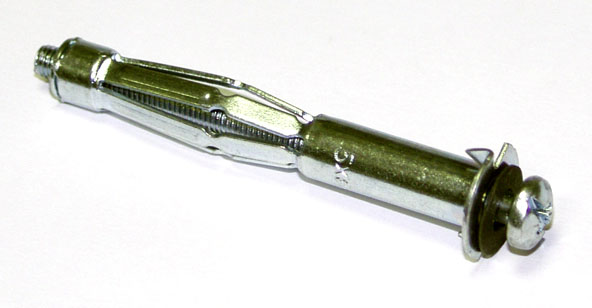
Molly fastener

A molly or molly bolt (often misspelled moly) is a combination of machine-threaded screw and hollow wall anchor used to fasten objects to plaster or gypsum board. Molly bolts are used where there is no stud behind the drywall, and operate by the anchor component collapsing and expanding to create compression against the wallboard. Mollies come in various diameters and shank lengths, accommodating differing wallboard thicknesses; larger sizes, and multiple bolts used in combination, can accommodate heavier loads, such as shelving and flatscreen-TV mounts, than plastic drywall anchors.

The name Molly was formerly trademarked but is now often used in generic reference. Other names used for this same general type of fastener include hollow-wall anchor and hollow-door anchor, sometimes with design variations but always operating on the same princple of expansion via deformation as the screw is tightened. The term drywall anchor covers a range of hollow-wall fasteners, including Mollies, toggle bolts, deformable plastic wall anchors (including wall plugs), and self-drilling threaded wall anchors.

== History ==
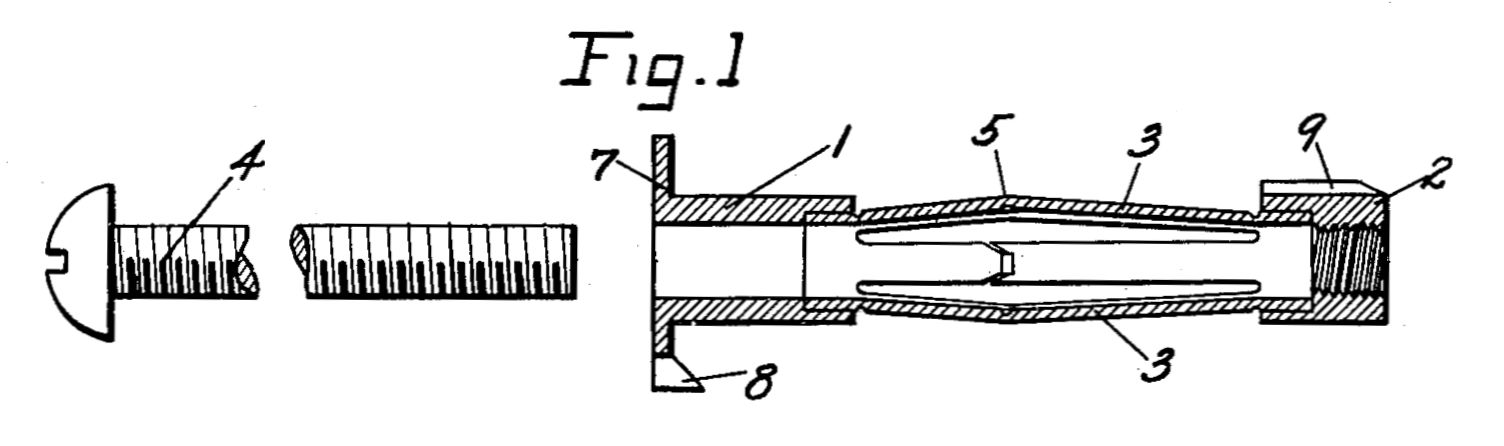
Figure 1 of the original patent for the molly bolt, U.S. Patent No. 2,018,251

The molly bolt was patented in 1934 by George Frederick Croessant. Although his patent acknowledges that expandable fasteners of this general kind were already known, Croessant's patent is intended to provide "an improved and adequate anchoring grip that may be retightened if necessary and that will permit repeated withdrawals and reengagements of the associated bolt." The same year, Croessant also registered the trademark "MOLLY".

== Attaching ==
A 1960s–1970s hollow-wall anchor setting tool by The Molly Company, for installing molly bolts and similar fasteners.

The anchor is slipped into a hole drilled to a suitable diameter, and its screw turned to deform the anchor shaft to compress the wallboard. The anchor flange features a pair of cleats/spikes to prevent the shaft from rotating when being compressed.

== See also ==
- Toggle bolt, a hollow wall anchor with hinged flaps or wings to spread out a load
