= Rawlplug =

Engineering company of the United Kingdom

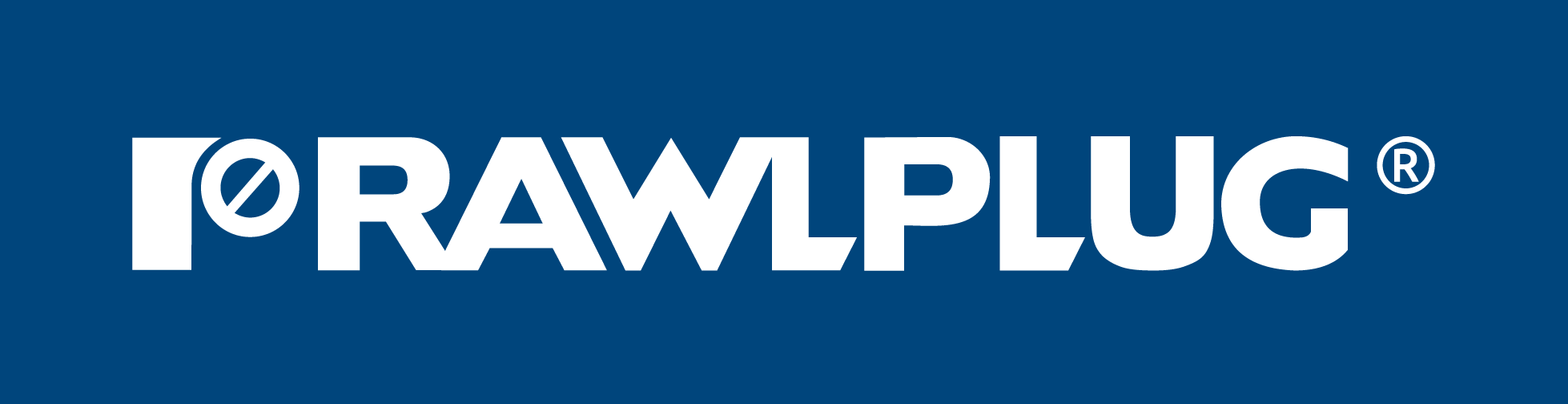
Rawlplug logo 2016

The Rawlplug Group is a company involved in the production of fixings, fasteners, and other tools.

== History ==
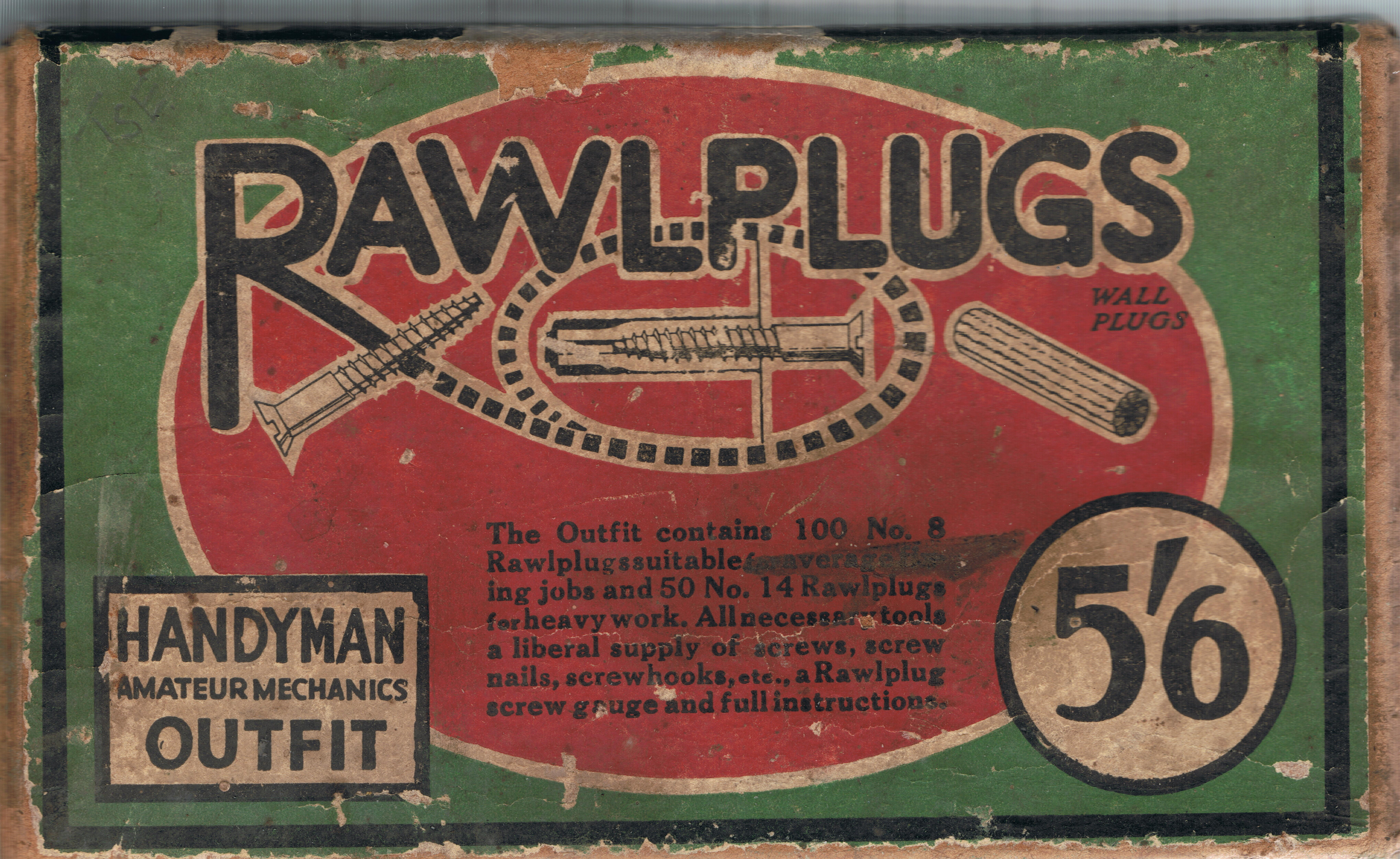

Rawlings Brothers, a small plumbing and electrical engineering company, was founded in 1887 in London. In 1910, the company was awarded a contract by the British Museum, which required them to unobtrusively fix electrical fittings to the museum walls. The contract led to the invention and patenting of the world's first wall plug, which became a standard solution for attaching things to walls. John Joseph Rawlings, who is credited with the invention of the wall plug, named his product Rawlplug, using the first syllable of his last name, and renamed his business Rawlplug in 1919.

== Products ==
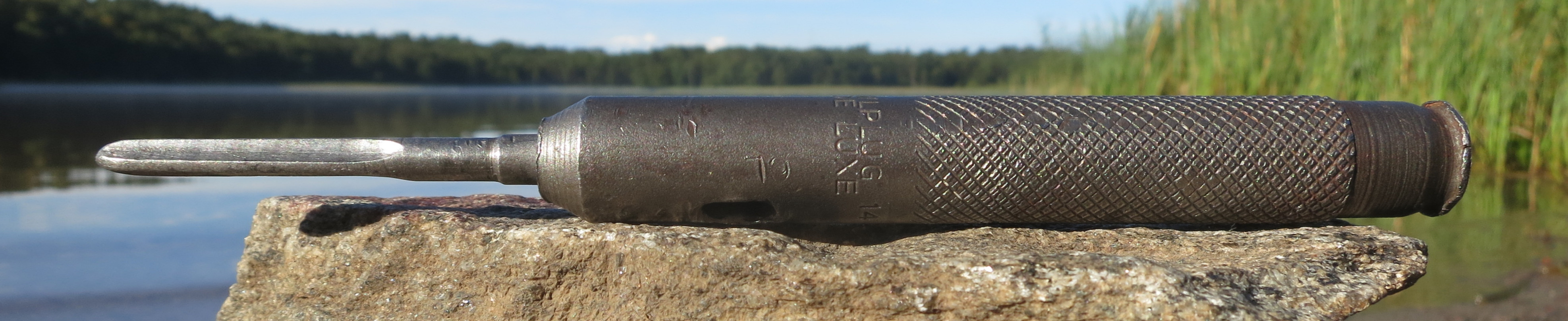
Mid-20th-century hand-held Rawlplug jumper masonry drill

During the inter-war period, the Rawlplug company patented some new fixing methods and tools. After the war, it invented the first metal drywall anchor in 1947.

== ETA registration ==
The company continued to sell its products worldwide and in 1998 became the first British producer to attain ETA certification. Since the death of John Joseph Rawlings, the business changed hands a few times until in 2005 it was bought by Koelner Group, a Wrocław-based manufacturer.
