= Toggle bolt =

Type of fastener

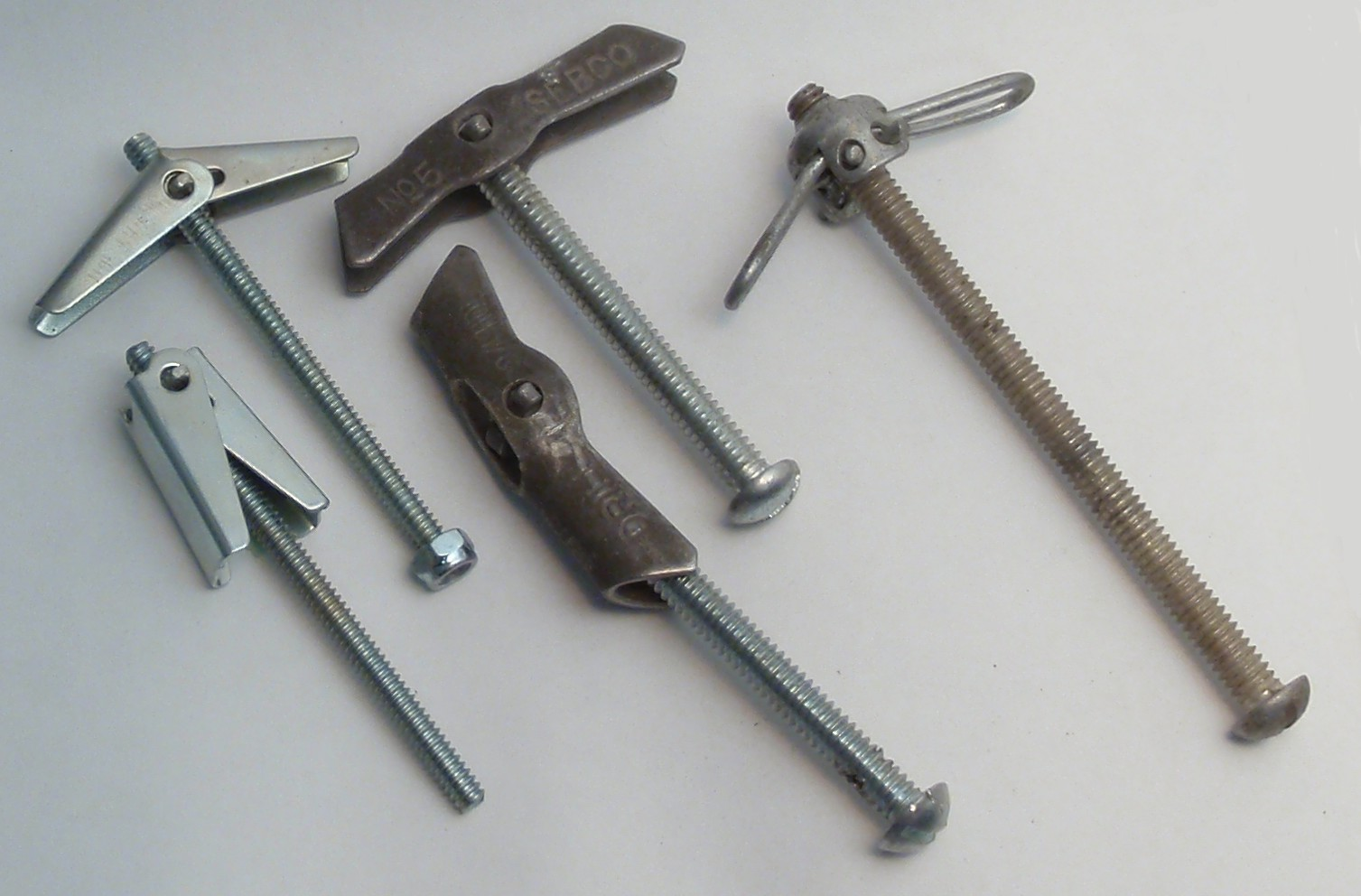
various opened and closed toggle bolts

A toggle bolt, also known as a butterfly anchor, is a fastener for hanging objects on hollow walls such as drywall.

Toggle bolts have wings that open inside a hollow wall, bracing against it to hold the fastener securely.

The wings, once fully opened, greatly expand the surface area making contact with the back of the hollow wall. This ultimately spreads out the weight of the secured item, increasing the weight that can be secured compared to a regular bolt.

== See also ==
- Molly (fastener)
