= Machine element =

Elementary components used in the structure, controls, or mechanisms of a machine

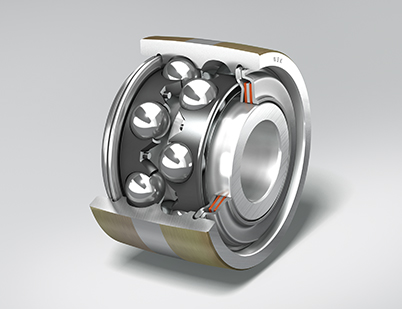
NSK Support Roller cut (cropped)

Machine element or hardware refers to an elementary component of a machine. These elements consist of three basic types:

1. structural components such as frame members, bearings, axles, splines, fasteners, seals, and lubricants,
2. mechanisms that control movement in various ways such as gear trains, belt or chain drives, linkages, cam and follower systems, including brakes and clutches, and
3. control components such as buttons, switches, indicators, sensors, actuators and computer controllers.

While generally not considered to be a machine element, the shape, texture and color of covers are an important part of a machine that provide a styling and operational interface between the mechanical components of a machine and its users.

Machine elements are basic mechanical parts and features used as the building blocks of most machines. Most are standardized to common sizes, but customs are also common for specialized applications.

Machine elements may be features of a part (such as screw threads or integral plain bearings) or they may be discrete parts in and of themselves such as wheels, axles, pulleys, rolling-element bearings, or gears. All of the simple machines may be described as machine elements, and many machine elements incorporate concepts of one or more simple machines. For example, a leadscrew incorporates a screw thread, which is an inclined plane wrapped around a cylinder.

Modern kinematics supplanted the theory of simple machines throughout the 19th century with the creation of kinematic chain theory, which mathematically models machine elements as parts of a system of links and joints with constrained relative motion.

Many mechanical design, invention, and engineering tasks involve a knowledge of various machine elements and an intelligent and creative combining of these elements into a component or assembly that serves an application.

== Structural elements ==
1. Beams,
2. Struts,
3. Bearings,
4. Fasteners
5. Keys,
6. Splines,
7. Cotter pin,
8. Seals
9. Machine guardings

== Mechanical elements ==
1. Engine,
2. Electric motor,
3. Actuator,
4. Shafts,
5. Couplings
6. Belt,
7. Chain,
8. Cable drives,
9. Gear train,
10. Clutch,
11. Brake,
12. Flywheel,
13. Cam,
14. follower systems,
15. Linkage,
16. Simple machine

== Types ==
- Shafts
- Coupling
  - Key
  - Spline
- Bearing
  - Roller bearing
  - Plain bearing
  - Thrust bearing
  - Ball bearing
  - Linear bearing
  - Pillow block
- Gears
  - Spur gear
  - Helical gear
  - Worm gear
  - Herringbone gear
- Fastener
  - Screw
    - Screw thread
  - Nut
  - Clevis fastener
  - Retaining ring
    - Circlip
    - E-ring
  - Split pin cotter pin)
  - Linchpin
  - R-clip
  - Rivet
  - Tapered pin
  - O-ring
- Belt
  - Pulleys
- Clutch
- Brake
- Chain
  - Sprocket
- Wire rope
- Power screw

== See also ==
- Tool
- Electrical element
- Electronic component
- List of sensors
