= Linchpin =

Pin to prevent a rotating part from sliding off an axle

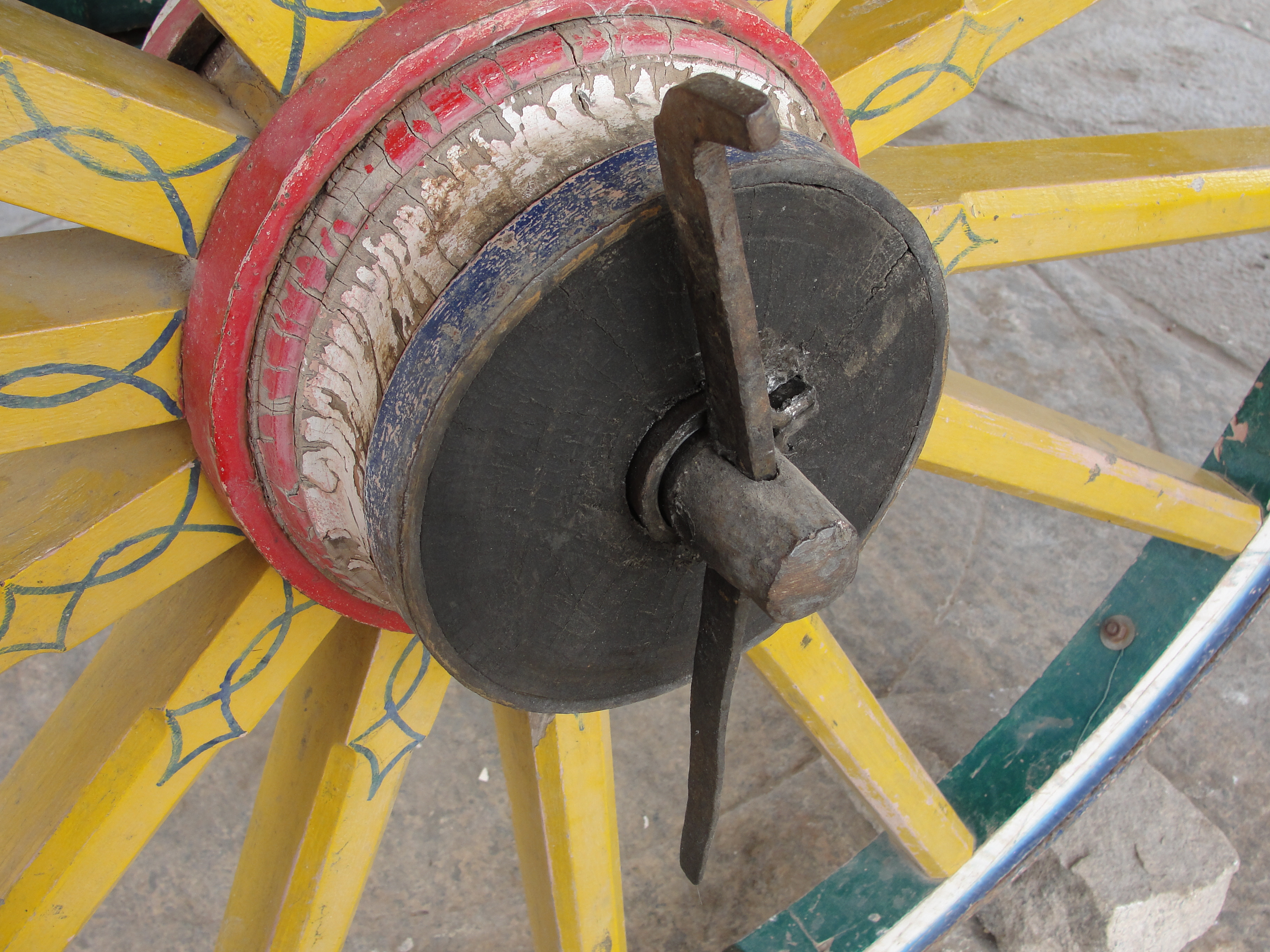
Wagon wheel, with forged linchpin

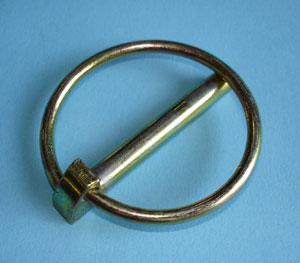
A modern linchpin with an integral spring retainer

A linchpin, also spelled lynchpin, is a fastener used to prevent a wheel or other part from sliding off the axle upon which it is riding. The word is first attested in the late fourteenth century and derives from Middle English elements meaning "axletree pin".

Securing implements onto the three-point hitch of a tractor is an example of application. Linchpins may also be used in place of an R-clip for securing hitch pins.

== Metaphorical use ==
The word linchpin is also used figuratively to mean 'something (or someone) that holds the various elements of a complicated structure together'. Another word to this effect is keystone.

== See also ==
- Circle cotter – Ring type of retaining component
- Circlip – Type of fastener or retaining ring
- Clevis fastener – Fastener consisting of a U-shaped bracket through which a pin is placed
- Cotter (pin) – Pin or wedge passing through a hole to fix parts tightly together
- Hairpin clip
- Kingpin (automotive part) – Main pivot in a steering mechanism, or part of the fifth wheel coupling for a semi truck
- R-clip – Type of fastener made of a springy material
- Split pin – Metal fastener with two tines that are bent during installation
- Spring pin – Mechanical fastener
