= R-clip =

Type of fastener made of a springy material

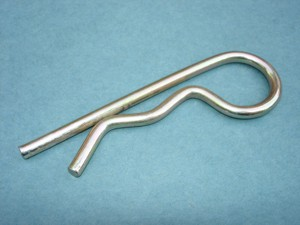
Typical R-clip

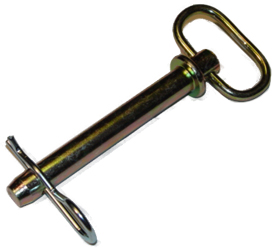
Hitch pin with R-clip inserted

Cotter pins: A: New split pin B: Installed split pin C: R-clip D: Cross-section of a new split pin

An R-clip, also known as an R-pin, R-key, hairpin cotter pin, hairpin cotter, bridge pin, hitch pin clip or spring cotter pin, is a fastener made of a durable but flexible material, commonly hardened metal wire, resembling the shape of the letter "R".

R-clips are commonly used to secure the ends of round shafts such as axles and clevis pins. The straight leg of the R-clip is pushed into a hole near one end of the shaft until the semicircular "belly" in the middle of the other, bent leg of the R-clip grips one side of the shaft resisting any force removing the R-clip from its hole. To assist insertion, the end of the bent leg is angled away from the straight leg. This angled end rides the side of the shaft and opens the "belly" mouth enough to pass the widest part of the shaft as the R-clip is inserted.

There is also a double loop variety when a wider range of suitable shafts is required, and to facilitate the attachment of a retaining tether to prevent the pin's loss when removed. It also spreads out the stresses more evenly for a longer life.

This type of pin is usually made of round wire of a harder metal than is appropriate for traditional cotter pins.

R-clips are similar in function to split pins and linchpins. Compared to split pins, they are easier to remove and are re-usable.

DIN 11024 is example of standard that defines a set of R-clips.

== Uses ==
- Hitch pin clip (vehicles, towing, caravans)
- Hood pin (stock car racing)
- Button attachment (brass buttons on certain military, railroad, and other uniform jackets)
- Body fastener (radio-controlled car)

== See also ==
- Circle cotter
- Hairpin clip
- Linchpin
- Split pin
- Spring pin
