= Fastener =

Device that mechanically joins objects

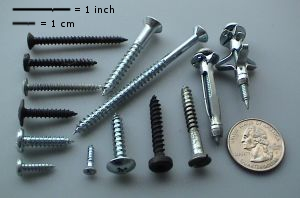
Typical fasteners (US quarter shown for scale)

A fastener (US English) or fastening (UK English) is a hardware device that mechanically joins or affixes two or more objects together. In general, fasteners are used to create non-permanent joints; that is, joints that can be removed or dismantled without damaging the joining components.

Other methods of joining materials, some of which may create permanent joints, include: crimping, welding, soldering, brazing, taping, gluing, cement, stitching, sewing, press-fitting, shrink-fitting or the use of other adhesives. Force may also be used, such as with magnets, vacuum (like suction cups), or even friction (like sticky pads). Some types of woodworking joints make use of separate internal reinforcements, such as dowels or biscuits, which in a sense can be considered fasteners within the scope of the joint system, although on their own they are not general-purpose fasteners.

Furniture supplied in flat-pack form often uses cam dowels locked by cam locks, also known as conformat fasteners. Fasteners can also be used to close a container such as a bag, a box, or an envelope; or they may involve keeping together the sides of an opening of flexible material, attaching a lid to a container, etc. There are also special-purpose closing devices, e.g., a bread clip.

Items like a rope, string, wire, cable, chain, or plastic wrap may be used to mechanically join objects; however, because they have additional common uses, they are not generally categorized as fasteners. Likewise, hinges and springs may join objects together, but they are ordinarily not considered fasteners because their primary purpose is to allow articulation rather than rigid affixment.

== Industry ==
In 2005, it was estimated that the United States fastener industry runs 350 manufacturing plants and employs 40,000 workers. The industry is strongly tied to the production of automobiles, aircraft, appliances, agricultural machinery, commercial construction, and infrastructure. More than 200 billion fasteners are used per year in the U.S., 26 billion of these by the automotive industry. The largest distributor of fasteners in North America is the Fastenal Company.

== Materials ==
Metals are commonly used. There are three major steel fasteners used in industries: stainless steel, carbon steel, and alloy steel. The major grade used in stainless steel fasteners: 200 series, 300 series, and 400 series. Titanium, aluminium, and various alloys are also common materials of construction for metal fasteners. In many cases, special coatings or plating may be applied to metal fasteners to improve their performance characteristics by, for example, enhancing corrosion resistance. Common coatings/platings include zinc, chrome, and hot-dip galvanizing.

== Applications ==
When selecting a fastener for industrial applications, it is important to consider a variety of factors. The threading, the applied load on the fastener, the stiffness of the fastener, and the number of fasteners needed should all be taken into account.

When choosing a fastener for a given application, it is important to know the specifics of that application to help select the proper material for the intended use. Factors that should be considered include:

- Accessibility
- Environment, including temperature, water exposure, and potentially corrosive elements
- Installation process
- Materials to be joined
- Reusability
- Weight restrictions

== Types ==
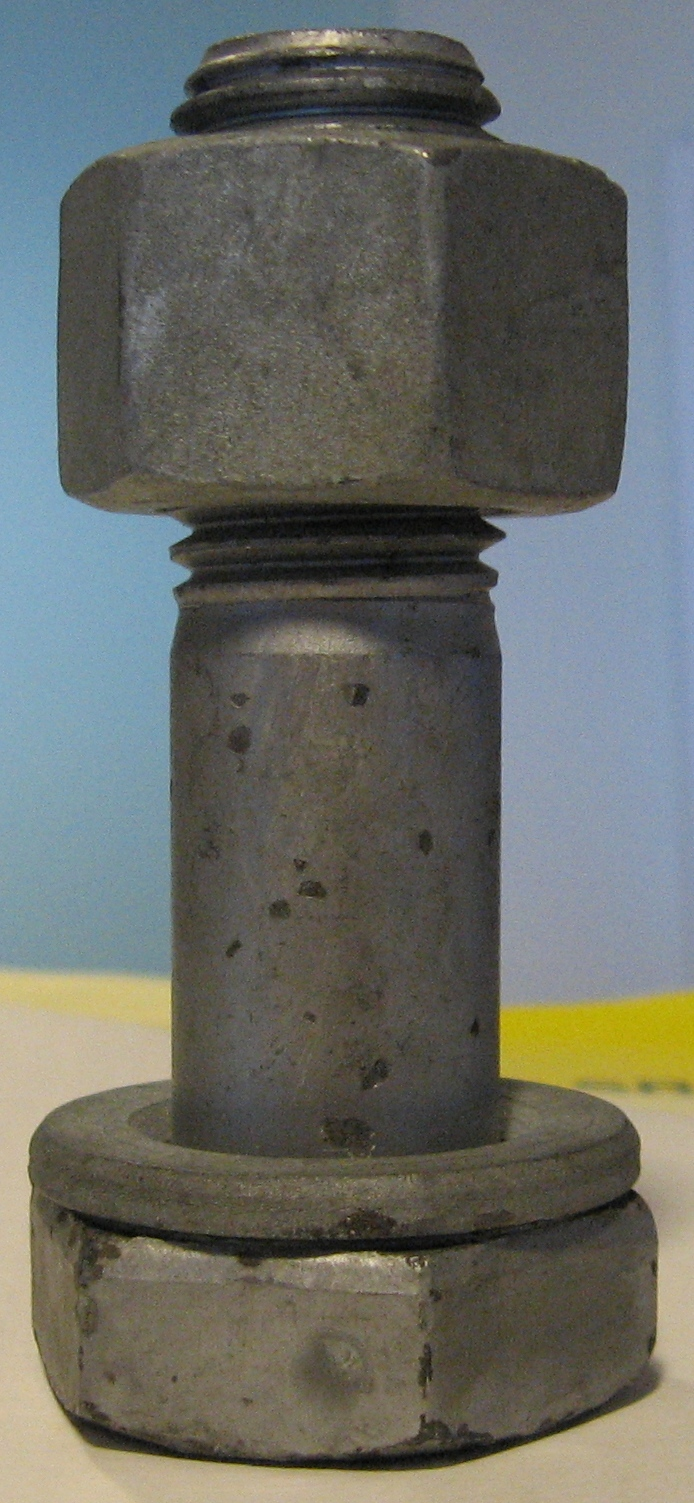
Structural bolt DIN 6914 with DIN 6916 washer and UNI 5587 nut

A threaded fastener has internal or external screw threads. The most common types are the screw, nut and bolt, possibly involving washers.

Other more specialized types of threaded fasteners include captive threaded fasteners, stud, threaded inserts, and threaded rods.

Other types of fastener include:

- anchor bolt
- batten
- bolt (fastener)
  - screw
- bolt snap
- brass fastener
- buckle
- button
- cable tie
- cam
- captive fastener
- clamp (or cramp)
  - hose clamp
- clasp and shackle
  - bolt snap
  - carabiner
  - circle cotter
  - lobster clasp
- cleco
- clip
  - Binder clip
  - Bulldog clip
  - Crocodile clip
  - circlip
  - Clothespin
  - hairpin clip
  - paper clip
  - terry clip
- clutch
- drawing pin (thumbtack)
- flange
- frog
- grommet
- hook-and-eye closure
- hook and loop fastener
  - Velcro
- latch
- nail and rivet
  - solid/round head rivets
  - semi-tubular rivets
  - blind (pop) rivet
- pegs
  - tent peg
- PEM nut
- pins
  - clevis fastener
  - cotter
  - dowel
  - linchpin
  - R-clip
  - safety pin
  - split pin
  - spring pin
  - tapered pin
- retaining rings
  - circlip
  - e-ring
- rivet-like
  - well nut
- rock bolt
- rubber band (or bands of other materials)
- screw anchor
- snap fastener
- snap-fit
- staple
- stitches
- strap
- tie
- toggle bolt
- tolerance rings
- treasury tag
- twist tie
- wedge anchor
- zipper

=== Common fastener head styles ===
Common head styles include:

- Flat head fasteners: Ideal for applications where aesthetics are a priority, flat head fasteners sit flush with the surface, offering a clean appearance.
- Round head fasteners: With a rounded top, round head fasteners provide a larger bearing surface, suitable for sheet metal or thin plastic assemblies.
- Pan head fasteners: Pan head fasteners combine a slightly flattened top with a larger bearing surface, offering a streamlined appearance for aesthetic applications.
- Socket head fasteners: Designed for high torque applications, socket head fasteners are driven with a hex key, reducing the risk of cam-out.
- Hex head fasteners: Known for their high torque capacity, hex head fasteners are easily driven with a spanner or wrench, ideal for heavy-duty applications.
- Square head fasteners: Offering increased wrenching area and reduced risk of rounding off, square head fasteners are used in high torque applications.
- Flange head fasteners: Integrating a flange for a larger bearing surface, flange head fasteners distribute clamping force without damaging the material.
- Wing head fasteners: Featuring protruding "wings" for hand tightening, wing head fasteners are suitable for applications requiring frequent adjustments.
- T-slot fasteners: Designed for T-slotted aluminium extrusions, T-slot fasteners provide a secure and adjustable connection for framing and guarding systems.

== Standards and traceability ==
There are multiple standards bodies for fasteners, including the US Industrial Fasteners Institute and the European Industrial Fastener Institute.

=== ASME B18 standards on certain fasteners ===
The American Society of Mechanical Engineers (ASME) publishes several standards on fasteners. Some are:

- B18.3 Socket Cap, Shoulder, Set Screws, and Hex Keys (Inch Series)
- B18.6.1 Wood Screws (Inch Series)
- B18.6.2 Slotted Head Cap Screws, Square Head Set Screws, And Slotted Headless Set Screws (Inch Series)
- B18.6.3 Machine Screws, Tapping Screws, and Metallic Drive Screws (Inch Series)
- B18.18 Quality Assurance For Fasteners
- B18.24 Part Identifying Number (PIN) Code System Standard for B18 Fastener Products

=== For military hardware ===
American screws, bolts, and nuts were historically not fully interchangeable with their British counterparts, and therefore would not fit British equipment properly. This, in part, helped lead to the development of numerous United States Military Standards and specifications for the manufacturing of essentially any piece of equipment that is used for military or defense purposes, including fasteners. World War II was a significant factor in this change.

A key component of most military standards is traceability. Put simply, hardware manufacturers must be able to trace their materials to their source, and provide traceability for their parts going into the supply chain, usually via bar codes or similar methods. This traceability is intended to help ensure that the right parts are used and that quality standards are met in each step of the manufacturing process; additionally, substandard parts can traced back to their source.

=== History ===
In 1988, the United States House Energy Subcommittee on Oversight and Investigations investigated counterfeit, mismarked, substandard fasteners and found extensive use in critical civilian and military infrastructure. As a result, they proposed Fastener Quality Assurance Act of 1988 (HR5051) that would require laboratory testing of fasteners in critical use applications prior to sale.

== See also ==
- Safety wire
- Taiwan International Fastener Show
