= Split ring =

Split ring may refer to the following:

== Engineering ==
- Split-ring resonator is a unit which enhances magnetic permeability and magnetic coupling for metamaterials.
- Split-ring connector is a ring shaped type of timber connector that is in inserted in routed grooves between timber members in order to reduce stresses to the timbers at the connection points.
- Commutator (electric), also called split rings.

== General ==
- A small keyring
- Circle cotter, also known as a cotter ring, a formed wire fastener that is shaped like a circle, hence the name.
