= Cleco =

Cleco may refer to:

- Cleco Holdings, an energy company, formerly Cleco Corporation
- Cleco (fastener), a temporary fastener used in sheetmetal work, particularly aircraft manufacture. Sometimes misspelled 'cleko'.
