= E Ring =

E Ring or E-ring may refer to:

- A ring of Saturn
- E-Ring, a television series
- The outer ring of The Pentagon, occupied by the most senior officers and their planning staffs
- A specific type of retaining ring, named after its rounded "E" shape
