= Watchimals =

1980s toy line

Watchimal
- Type: Stuffed animal-shape digital watch
- Company: Hasbro
- Country: United States
- Availability: 1985–1986
- Features: Animals

Watchimals were a wearable toy, marketed mainly for girls, with a LCD watch inside. They were made by Hasbro in their heyday of the mid-1980s. Watchimals took the form of furry wristbands with different animal heads. When the animal head was flipped open, the digital watch appeared. The advertisement slogan was: "Just open his mouth and he'll show you the time! They're all soft animal friends with a real watch inside!"

== Series ==
Beginning in 1985, Watchimals were produced in two series.

=== First Series ===
The first series included six characters:

- Elephant
- Bear
- Toucan
- Peacock
- Mouse
- Butterfly

=== Second Series ===
In 1986, six more characters were added:

- Snail
- Dragonfly
- Dog
- Goldfish
- Unicorn
- Moose

== Overseas Editions ==
Another Watchimal, Ladybird was primarily marketed in the United Kingdom. Other international Watchimals had different color schemes than those in the United States.

== Related Series: Wearimals ==
Wearimals were pairs of furry animals, also made by Hasbro, made in the same style as Watchimals. Wearimals were about the same size as Watchimals and could be mixed and matched. They included a clip for attaching onto hair, clothes, and schoolbags. There were six Wearimals:

- Butterfly
- Cat
- Goldfish
- Peacock
- Pig
- Snail
