= Bisco industries =

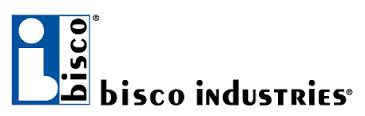
- Industry: Electronics
- Founder: Glen F. Ceiley
- Date Founded: March 15, 1973
- Number of Employees: 500+
- Website: www.biscoind.com
- Products: Electronic Components & Fasteners
- Headquarters: Anaheim, CA
- Revenue: $136.8 million (2015), $133 million (2014), $250 million (2019)
- Chairman & CEO: Glen Ceiley
- President & COO: Don Wagner
- Vice President, Sales & Marketing: Zach Ceiley
- Director of Materials: Courtney Cresap

Bisco industries (stylized as bisco industries) is a distributor of electronic components and fasteners, founded in Chicago, Illinois by Glen Ceiley on March 15, 1973. Bisco industries serves customers in many industries including electronics, aerospace and fabrication. Bisco industries has 51 locations throughout the United States and Canada and 1 location in the Philippines which employ over 500 employees.

In March 2010, EACO corporation completed the acquisition of Bisco industries, Inc. Prior to the acquisition, Glen Ceiley was the sole shareholder of Bisco industries and also controlled the majority of common stock issued by EACO. Bisco industries performs day-to-day operations for EACO corporation which includes administration and accounting services.

According to Global Purchasing, Bisco industries is ranked 20th in the Top 50 Electronics Distributors of 2015 with $136.8 million in sales revenue. In 2020 Bisco Industries was ranked 17th in the Top 50 Electronics Distributors by Source Today.

Bisco industries launched a blog series called What is it? Wednesday. The blog’s content focuses on educating readers on common electronic components and fasteners. The blogs contain information such as product descriptions, use applications, and technical resources for various products.
