= Split pin =

Metal fastener with two tines that are bent during installation

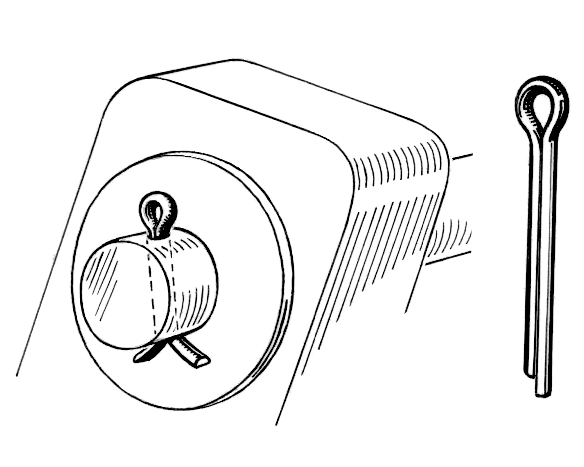
A split pin (UK usage) / cotter pin (UK/USA usage) holding a rod in place with a washer

A split pin, also known as a cotter pin, or cotter key in the US, is a metal fastener with two tines that are bent during installation, similar to a staple or rivet. Typically made of thick wire with a half-circular cross section, split pins come in multiple sizes and types.

The British definition of "cotter pin" may include the equivalent to US term "cotter". To avoid confusion, the term split cotter is sometimes used for a split pin. A further use of the term "cotter pin" is the "crank cotter pin" used to lock bicycle pedal cranks to the bottom bracket axle. These are not "split" at all and are wedge shaped.

== History ==
The cotter pin was invented by Ira J. Young of the Wire Manufacturing Company in St. Louis, Missouri in 1912. He filed two patents for machines to make the fastener that year.

== Construction ==
Cotter pins: A: New split pin B: Installed split pin C: R-clip D: Cross-section of a new split pin

A new split pin (see figure A) has its flat inner surfaces touching for most of its length so that it appears to be a split cylinder (figure D). Once inserted, the two ends of the pin are bent apart, locking it in place (figure B). When they are removed they are supposed to be discarded and replaced, because of fatigue from bending.

Split pins are typically made of soft metal, making them easy to install and remove, but also making it inadvisable to use them to resist strong shear forces. Common materials include mild steel, brass, bronze, stainless steel, and aluminium.

=== Types ===
Types of ends available on split pins: Standard, extended prong, mitre end, bevel end and hammer lock. The length L of the split pin is defined as the distance from the end of the shortest tine to the point of the eyelet that contacts the hole.

The most common type of split pin is the extended prong with a square cut, but extended prongs are available with all of the other types of ends. The extended prong type is popular because the difference in length of the two tines makes it easier to separate them. To ease insertion into a hole the longer tine may be slightly curved to overlap the tip of the shorter tine or it is beveled.

Hammer lock split pins are properly installed by striking the head with a hammer to secure the pin. This forces the shorter tine forward, spreading the pin.

Types include standard, humped and clinch.

=== Sizes ===
The diameters of split pins are standardized.

Metric split pin sizes
Nominal diameter mm	Hole size mm	For bolt size mm
1.5	1.9	6
2	2.4	8
2.5	2.8	10
3	3.4	12, 14
4	4.5	20
5	5.6	24, 28
6	6.3	30, 36, 42
8	8.5	48

American split pins start at 1/32 in and end at 3/4 in. Metric conversions in the table below are approximate.

American split pin sizes
Nominal diameter		Hole size		For bolt size	
in	mm	in	mm	in	mm
1/32	0.79	3/64	1.19		
3/64	1.19	1/16	1.59		
1/16	1.59	5/64	1.98	1/4	6.35
5/64	1.98	3/32	2.38	5/16	7.94
3/32	2.38	7/64	2.78	3/8	9.53
7/64	2.78	1/8	3.18		
1/8	3.18	9/64	3.57	1/2	12.70
9/64	3.57	5/32	3.97	5/8	15.88
5/32	3.97	11/64	4.37	3/4	19.05
3/16	4.76	13/64	5.16	1, 1 1/8	25.4, 28.58
7/32	5.56	15/64	5.95	1 1/4, 1 3/8	31.75, 34.93
1/4	6.35	17/64	6.75	1 1/2	38.10
5/16	7.94	5/16	7.94	1 3/4	44.45
3/8	9.53	3/8	9.53		
7/16	11.11	7/16	11.11		
1/2	12.70	1/2	12.70		
5/8	15.88	5/8	15.88		
3/4	19.05	3/4	19.05		

== Applications ==
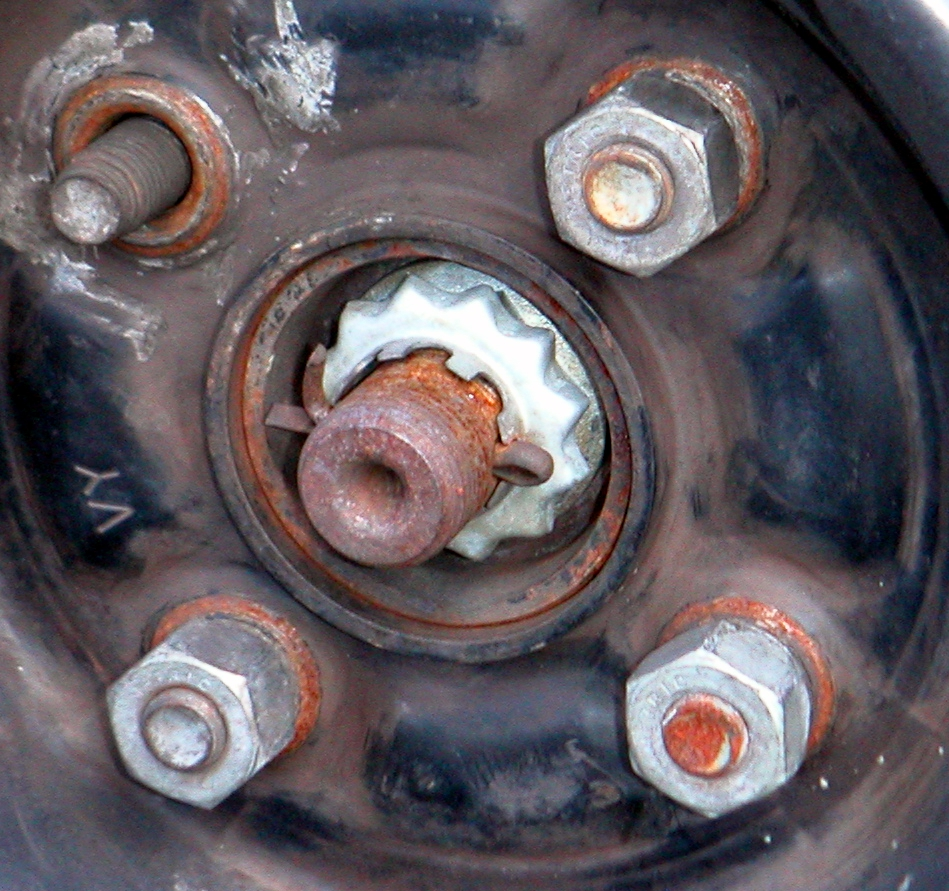
A car hub showing a castellated nut cover and split pin (near center)

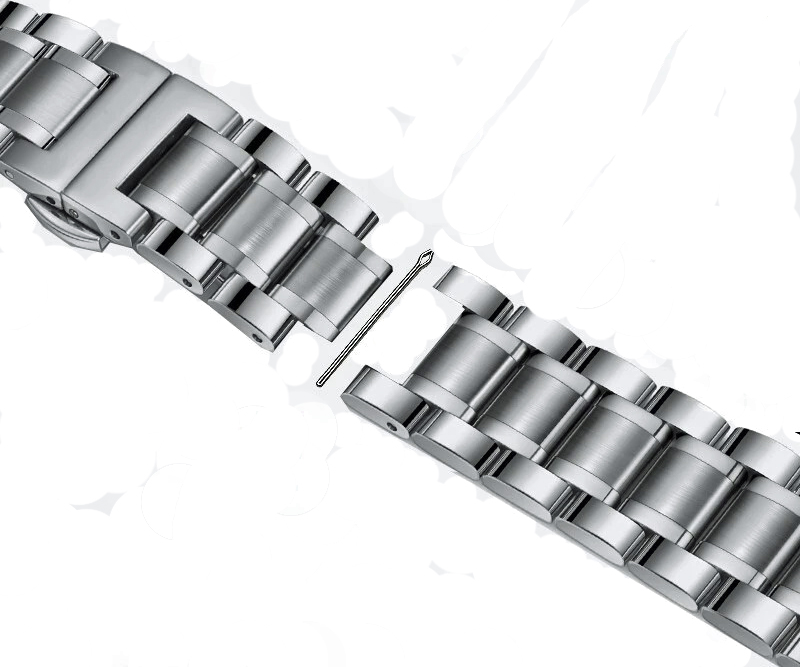
Watchband links connected by split pins

Split pins are frequently used to secure other fasteners, e.g. clevis pins, or to secure a castellated nut, or, infrequently, as a low-tech shear pin.

Split pins are cheaper but less reusable than linchpins, and provide less strength but easier to install/remove than spring pins.

Cotter pins are also occasionally used to attach Cap badges to their respective headwear.

== See also ==
- Cotter (pin)
- Circle cotter
- Hairpin clip
- Linchpin
- R-clip
- Spring pin
