= Captive fastener =

A captive fastener is an engineered fastener designed for a permanent hold within a target assembly or housing, including upon servicing. They provide a secure joining, and avoid fastener loss or damage that might be caused by a loose part.

A captive fastener is sometimes made with thread locking, press-fitting, or broaching to accomplish an anchor-hold within a larger assembly housing. However, a captive fastener may also be melded with the material into which it is joined, either through cold forming or welding.

Captive screws are a type of machine screw which are frequently used for safety reasons, often with a captive washer. They are now required by EU law on equipment such as safety guards so that machinery complies with EU Machine Safety Directive 2006/42/EC.
