= Dowel =

Cylindrical rod made of wood, plastic, or metal

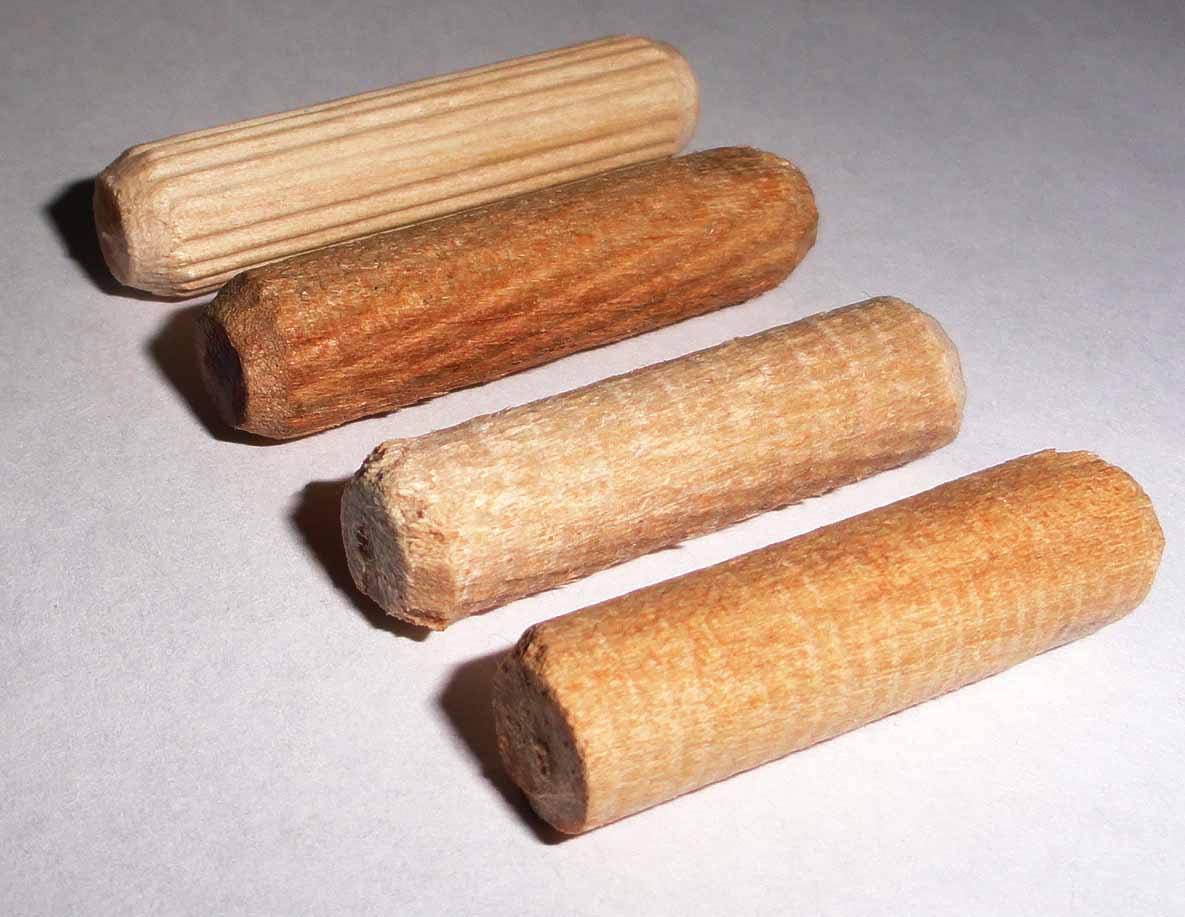
Wooden dowel pins

The dowel is a cylindrical shape made of wood, plastic, or metal. In its original manufactured form, a dowel is long and called a dowel rod, which are often cut into shorter dowel pins. Dowels are commonly used as structural reinforcements in cabinet making and in numerous other applications, including:

- Furniture shelf supports
- Moveable game pieces (i.e. pegs)
- Hangers for items such as clothing, key rings, and tools
- Wheel axles in toys
- Detents in gymnastics grips
- Supports for tiered wedding cakes

== Wood dowel ==
=== Manufacturing process ===
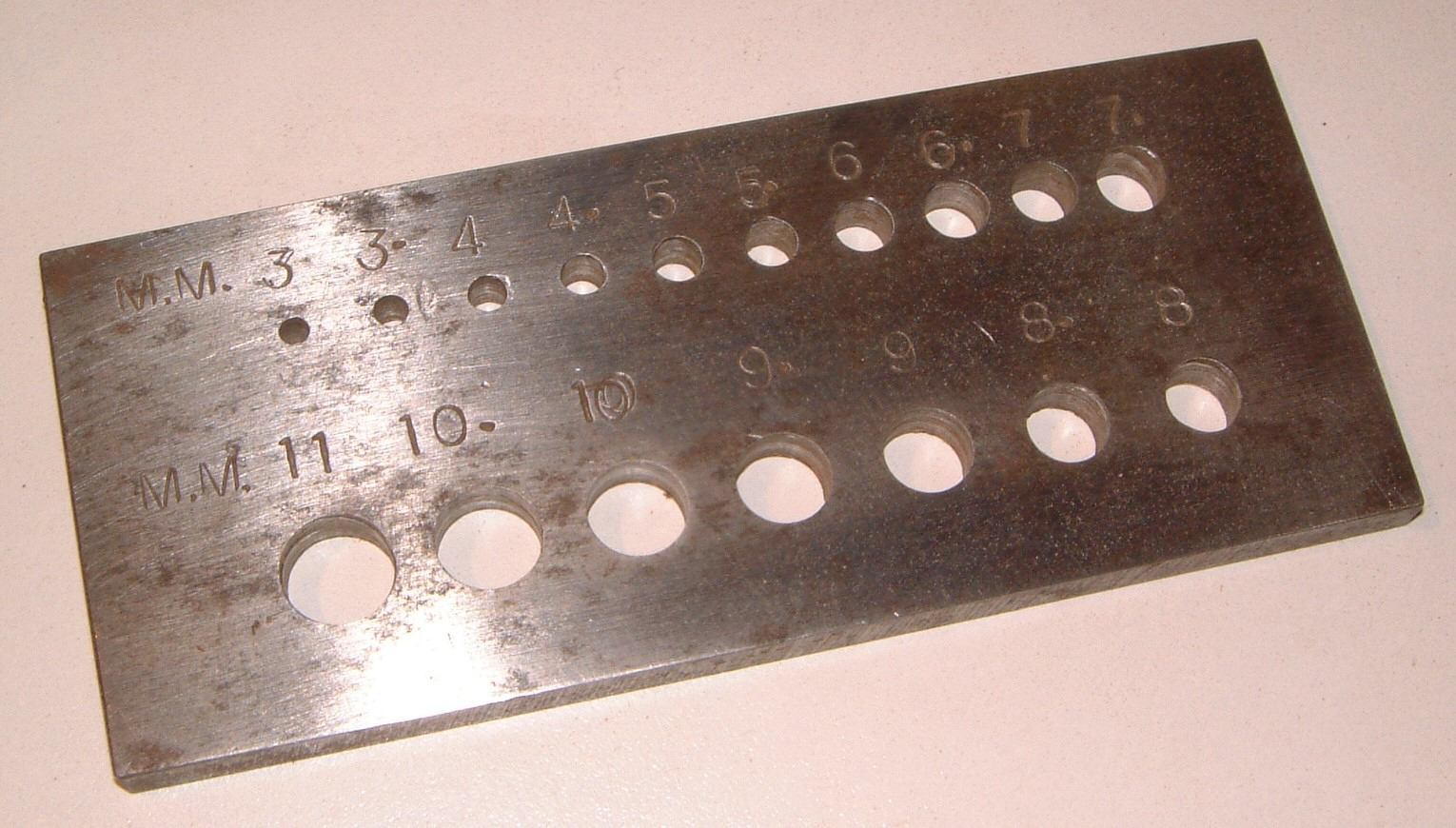
A dowel plate

The traditional tool for making dowels is a dowel plate, an iron (or better, hardened tool steel) plate with a hole having the size of the desired dowel. To make a dowel, a piece of wood is split or whittled to a size slightly bigger than desired and then driven through the hole in the dowel plate. The sharp edges of the hole shear off the excess wood.

A second approach to cutting dowels is to rotate a piece of oversized stock past a fixed knife, or alternatively, to rotate the knife around the stock. Machines based on this principle emerged in the 19th century. Frequently, these are small bench-mounted tools.

For modest manufacturing volumes, wood dowels are typically manufactured on industrial dowel machines based on the same principles as the rotary cutters described above. Such machines may employ interchangeable cutting heads of varying diameters, thus enabling the machines to be quickly changed to manufacture different dowel diameters. Typically, the mechanism is open-ended, with material guides at the machine's entry and exit to enable fabrication of continuous dowel rods of unlimited length. Since the 19th century, some of these dowel machines have had power feed mechanisms to move the stock past the cutting mechanism.

=== Application ===
When dowels are glued into blind holes, a very common case in dowel-based joinery, there must be a path for air and excess glue to escape when the dowel is pressed into place. If no provision is made to relieve the hydraulic pressure of air and glue, hammering the dowel home or clamping the joint can split the wood. An old solution to this problem is to plane a flat on the side of the dowel; some sources suggest planing the flat on the rough stock before the final shaping of the round dowel. Some dowel plates solve the problem by cutting a groove in the side of the dowel as it is forced through; this is done by a groove screw, a pointed screw intruding from the side into the dowel cutting opening.

When two pieces of wood are to be joined by dowels embedded in blind holes, there are numerous methods for aligning the holes. For example, pieces of shot may be placed between the wood pieces to produce indentations when the pieces are clamped together; after the clamp is released, the indentations indicate the center points for drilling.

=== History ===
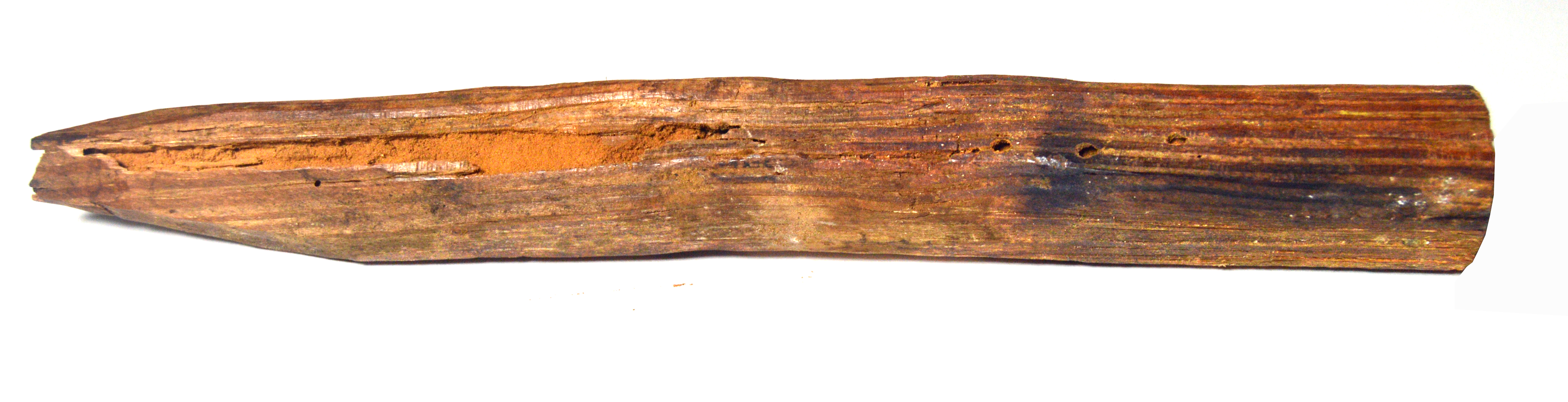
Hand cut 8" dowel, c1840

The word dowel was used in Middle English; it appears in Wycliffe's Bible translation (circa 1382–1395) in a list of the parts of a wheel: "...and the spokis, and dowlis of tho wheelis..."

== See also ==
- Bar stock
- Barrel nut
- Dowel reinforced butt joint
- Dowel bar retrofit
- Fastener
- Kinematic coupling
- Rebar
- Spring pin
- Threaded rod
- Treenail
