= Captive threaded fastener =

A captive threaded fastener may refer to:

- Cage nut
- Clip-on nut
- Rivet nut
- Threaded insert
