= Cotter (pin) =

Pin or wedge passing through a hole to fix parts tightly together

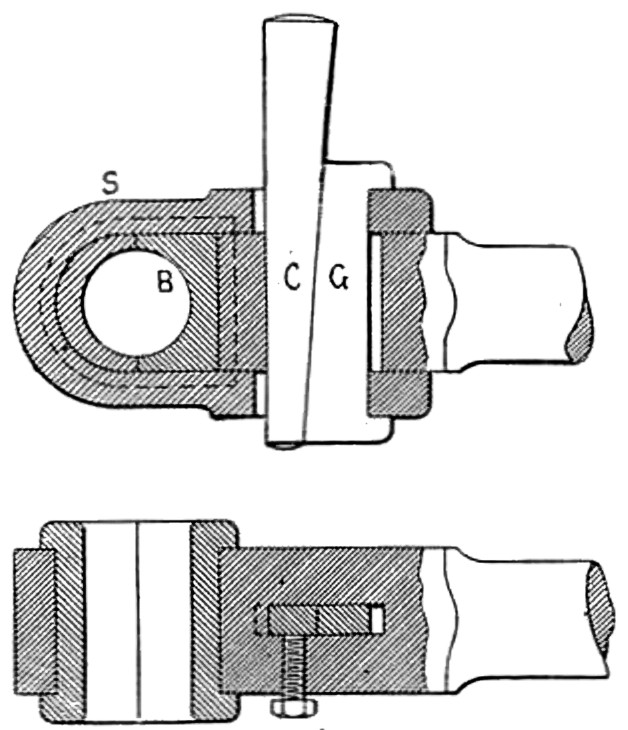
Cross-section of a connecting rod, showing strap (S), gib (G), and cotter pin (C)

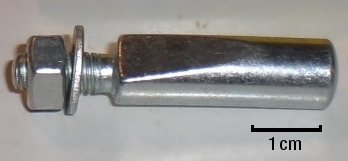
Another view, with scale, of bicycle crank cotter

A cotter is a pin or wedge with a flat bearing surface passing through a hole to fix parts tightly together. In British usage cotter pin has the same meaning, but in the U.S. it means a split pin.

Typical applications are in fixing a crank to its crankshaft, as in a bicycle, and a piston rod to a crosshead, as in a steam engine. The angle of the wedge determines the position of the parts being held; therefore, on a bicycle, the pedal arms will only be at 180 degrees to each other if the angle of the cotter pin's wedge is the same on both pins.

== Popular usage ==
Formerly, it was common to mount bicycle cranks using a cotter, although now a more easily maintained arrangement is typically used, such as a square tapered or splined interface. These cotters have a short threaded section at the narrower end of the taper, which is used to hold the cotter in place with a washer and nut. They are also used to secure ceiling fans to prevent falling if the mounting nut loosens.

== See also ==
- Bottom bracket – Bicycle component
- Crankset – Bicycle part
- Mechanical joint – Section of a machine which is used to connect one mechanical part to another
- Split pin – Metal fastener with two tines that are bent during installation
- Taper pin – Fastener consisting of a conical rod with a shallow taper which is forced into a hole
