= Cleco (fastener) =

Temporary mechanical fastener

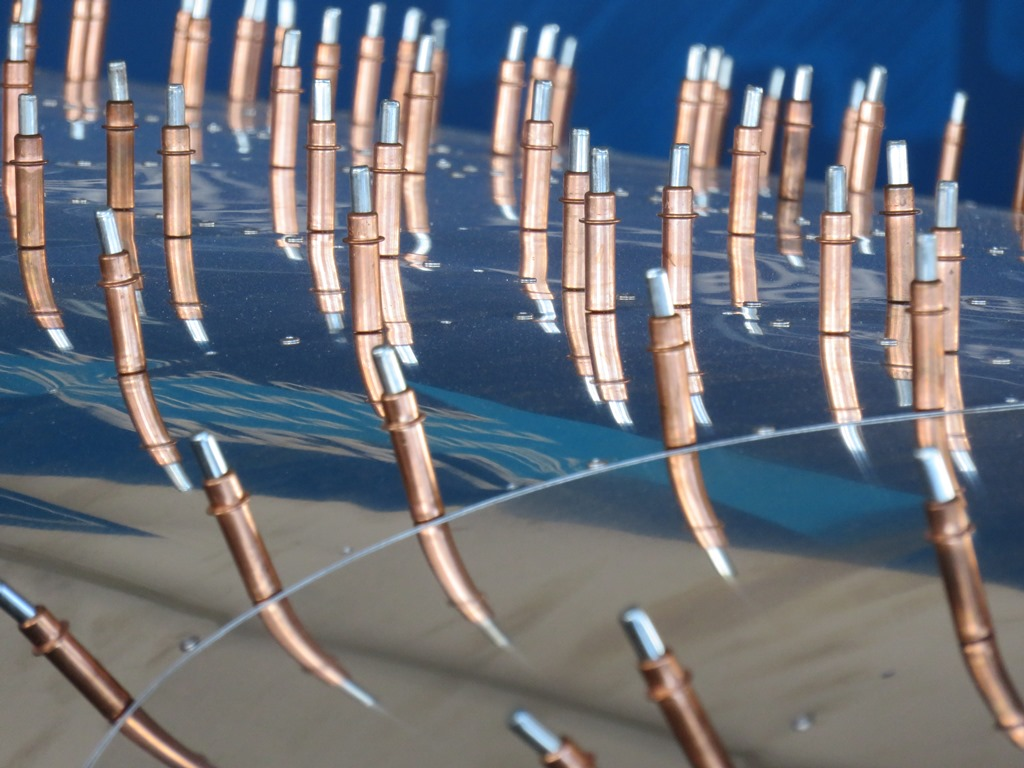
Cleco (Cleko) fasteners on an aircraft wing

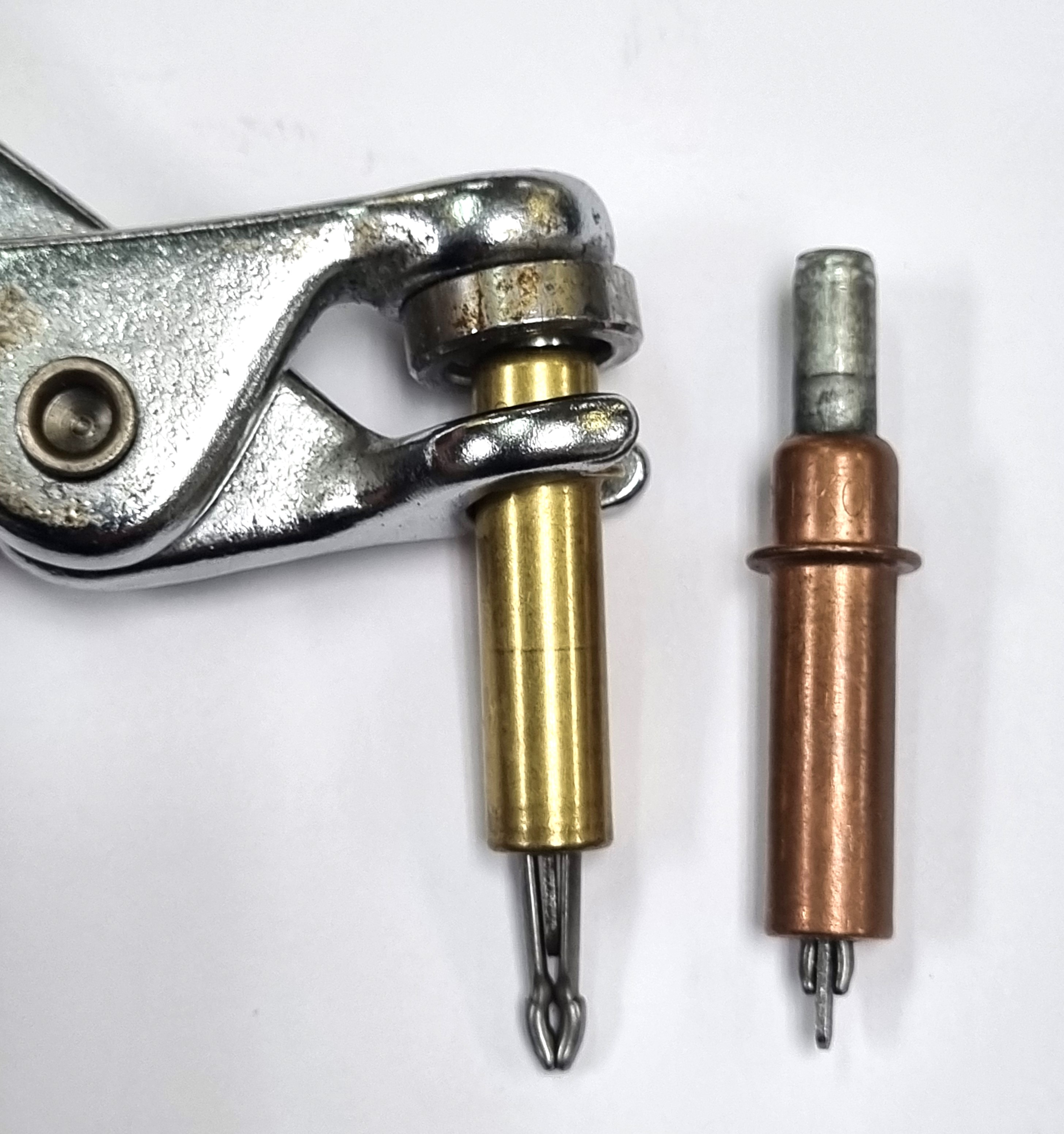
A 4.8mm Cleco fastener, extended, with a retracted 3.2mm fastener for comparison. Note the colour coding.

A cleco, also spelled generically cleko, is a temporary fastener developed by the Cleveland Pneumatic Tool Company. Widely used in the manufacture and repair of aluminum-skinned aircraft, it is used to temporarily fasten sheets of material together, or to hold parts such as stiffeners, frames etc together, before they are permanently joined.

== Operation ==
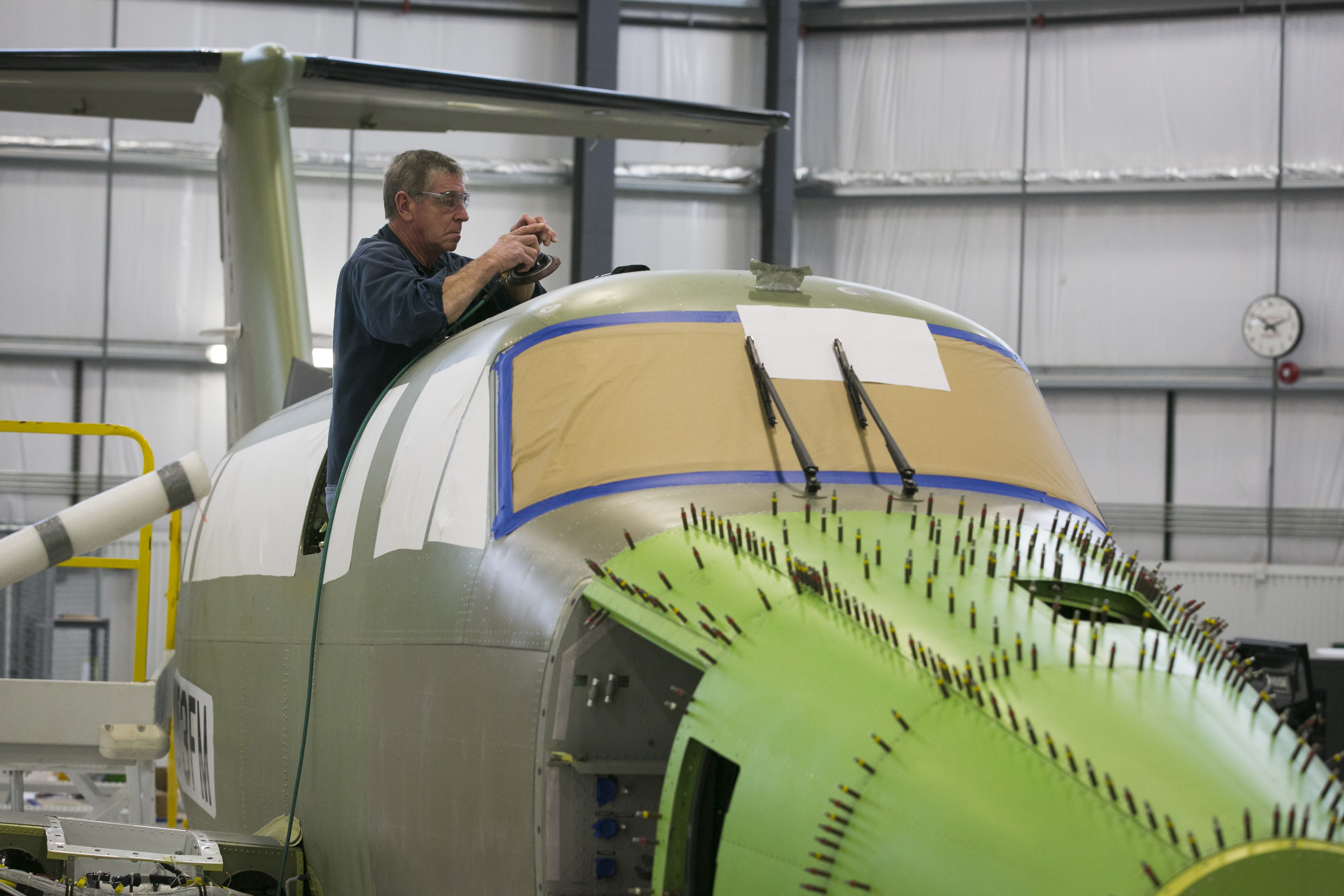
Clecos in use during an aircraft build

Clecos are installed in holes drilled through the workpieces (usually holes intended for permanent fasteners, like pop rivets, installed later). They expand on the far side of the workpieces and then draw and clamp them together while maintaining the desired alignment and preventing distortion of the pieces. Clecos should fit snugly in their holes to prevent shifting of the workpieces and maintain the alignment of fastener holes which do not have Clecos in them. They are blind fasteners; so they can be installed in assemblies where the worker does not have access to the other side. If permanent fasteners are to be installed in Cleco holes, a Cleco will be removed when its hole is needed. If the workpieces are bonded or welded, then the Cleco holes may need to be filled later.

== Fastener and tool ==
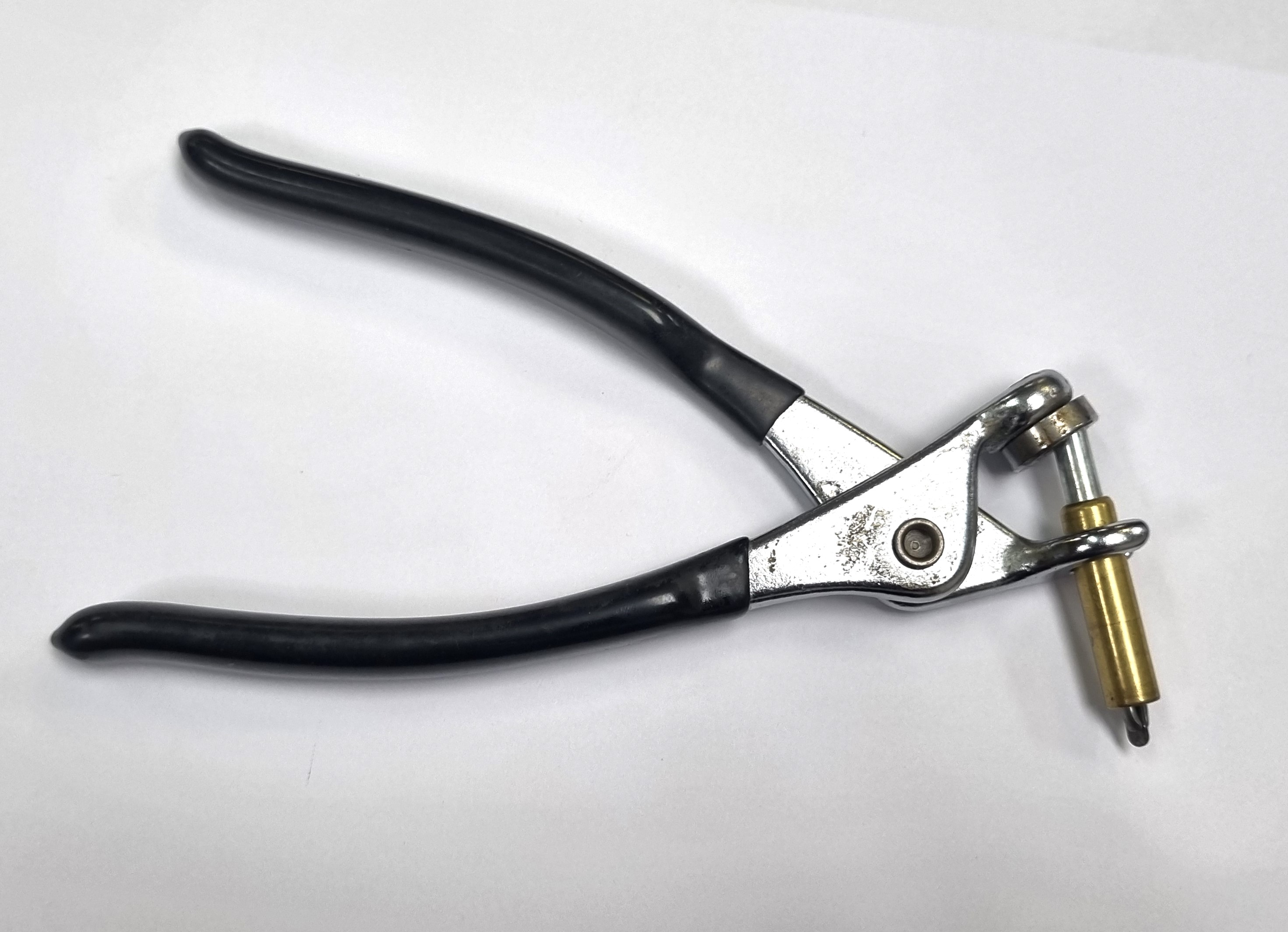
Cleco Tool for fitting temporary fasteners

The basic type consists of a steel cylinder body, a plunger on the top, a spring, a pair of step-cut locks, and a spreader bar. A special type of pliers are used to push in the spring-loaded plunger. This pushes down on the step-cut locks, which pushes them away from the spreader bars and allows them to come together. This allows the user to slip the locking jaws through a hole made through multiple sheets of material. When the plunger is released the spring pulls the locking jaws back towards the spreader bar, which separates the two jaws. The material sheets are then squeezed in between the step-cut area and the steel cylinder. This keeps the holes in the separate sheets aligned.

== Design variations ==
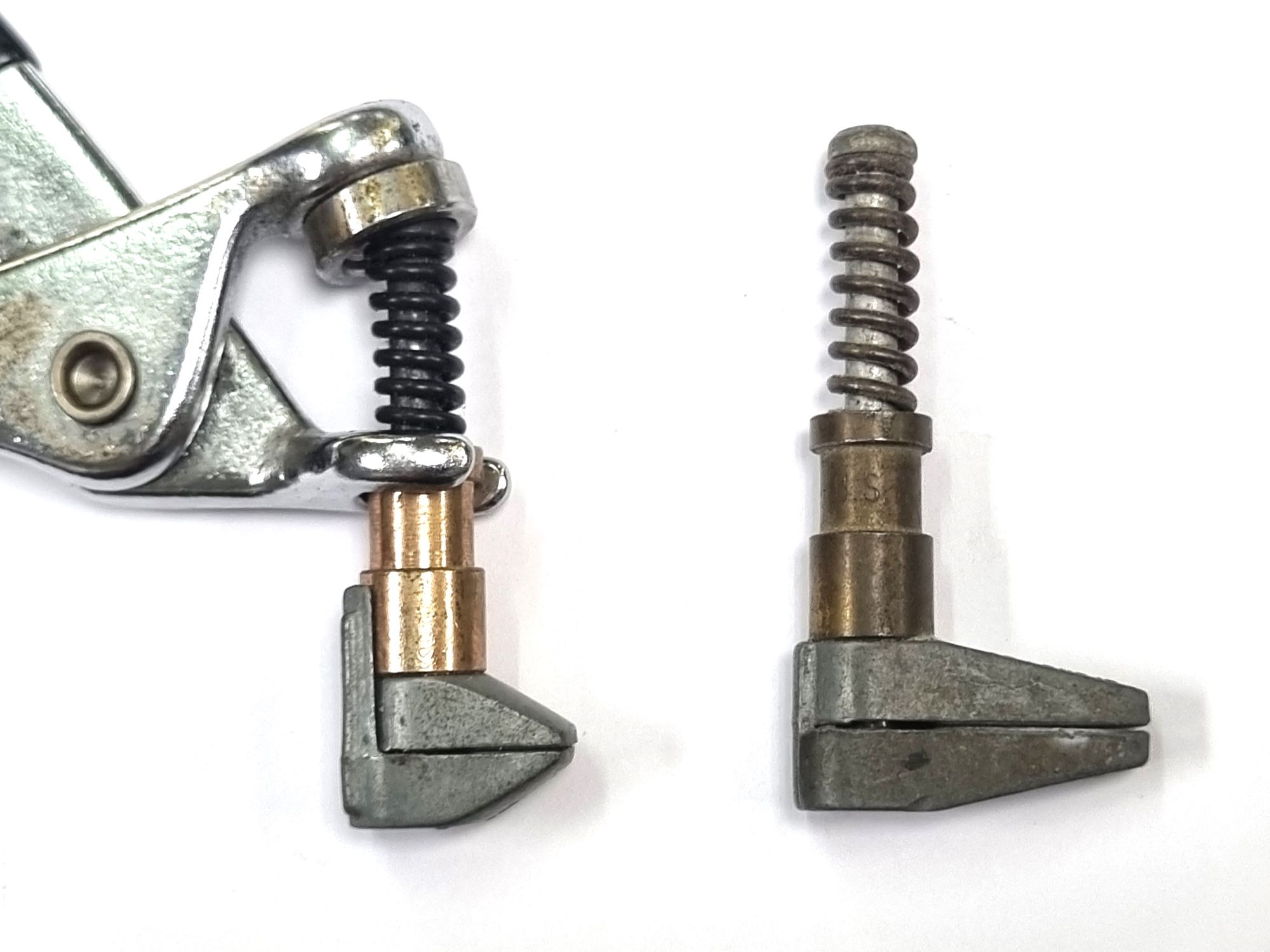
Clecoloc clamps

External image
- Different types of clecos

Cleco-type fasteners are also available with a threaded mechanism to draw the spreader bar up. Clecos of this type take more time to install and remove, but can pull parts together more tightly than the spring-type Clecos. They are commonly available with a wingnut for hand tightening, or with a simple hex nut so that they may be spaced more closely together. In either case they will usually have a hexagonal body that may be better gripped to tighten or release the spreader bar. Another variation is a side-clamp that is applied with the same plier tool.

== Sizes and color-coding ==
External image
- Four clecos showing color coding

Regardless of their form, they are typically color-coded for ready identification of their size.

Color	Size inches (mm)
Silver (zinc)	3/32 (2.4)
Copper	1/8 (3.2)
Black	5/32 (4.0)
Gold (brass)	3/16 (4.8)
