= Retaining ring =

Fastener which holds components onto a shaft

A retaining ring is a fastener that holds components or assemblies onto a shaft or in a housing/bore when installed - typically in a groove - for one time use only. Once installed, the exposed portion acts as a shoulder which retains the specific component or assembly. Circlips are a type of retaining ring.

Circular push-on retaining rings may be installed in applications where there is no groove.

Retaining rings are typically made from carbon steel, stainless steel or beryllium copper and may feature a variety of finishes for aesthetics and corrosion protection depending on the type of environment in which they are used.

== Types ==
There are four main types of retaining rings available, each of which may then be broken down into sub-types depending on unique application needs:

- Tapered section
  - Axially assembled
    - Inverted
    - Beveled
    - Bowed
  - Radially assembled
  - Self-locking
- Constant section
- Spiral
- Circular push-on
- Wave spiral retaining rings

== Tapered section retaining rings ==
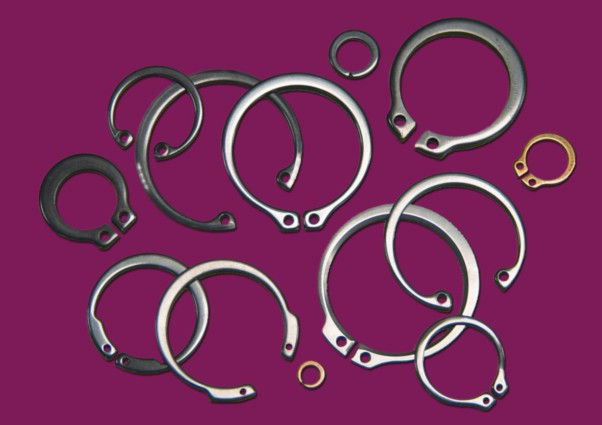
Axially installed retaining rings

Tapered section retaining rings decrease symmetrically from the center to the free ends, remaining circular when contracted or expanded within the limits of normal use. This assures contact with the groove along the entire periphery of the ring. These rings may be installed axially (horizontally along the center point of an axis) or radially (externally along the radius of a circle). Depending on the size of the ring in question, it may be manufactured in one of two ways:

- For smaller rings: using a die and stamping on a press from a coil of steel or copper
- For larger rings: wire forming, in which rectangular wire is coiled into the shape of the ring.

=== Axially assembled ===
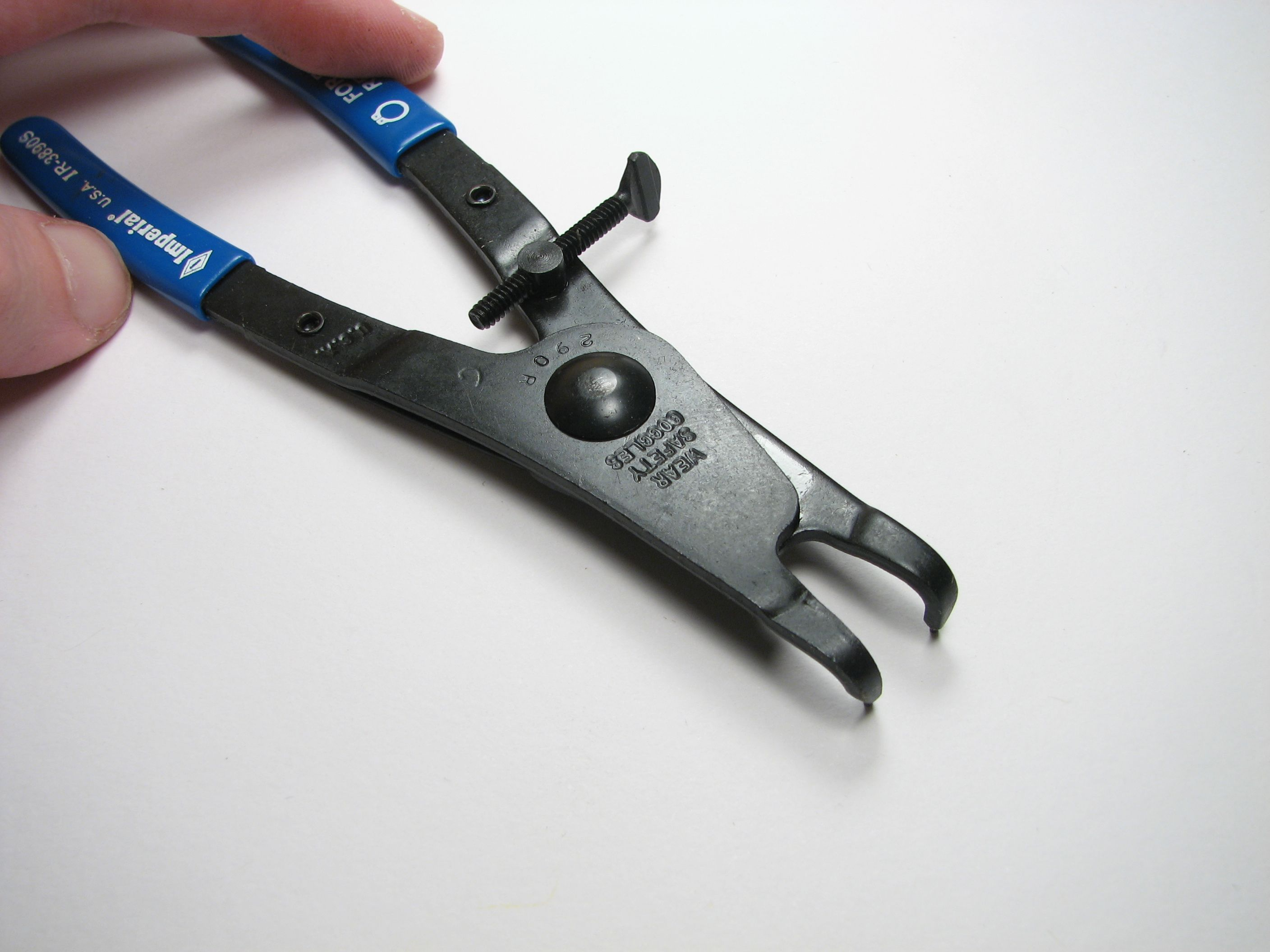
Pliers for installing and removing retaining rings

Axially assembled retaining rings are installed into machined grooves in housings/bores (internal) or on shafts (external). These rings are manufactured with lug holes—small holes in the lugs of both axial internal and external retaining rings—that are used to install/remove them, using pliers designed for this purpose.

Another mounting option is cone mounting, which simplifies industrial assembly, which is why it is often used in the automotive industry.

Today's ring design is based on the invention and patent of the German company Seeger-Orbis from 1928, which was transferred to the current standard ASME B18.27 - 1998 (German DIN 471 and DIN 472).

==== Inverted retaining rings ====
Inverted retaining rings are a variation of axially assembled rings in which the lug holes are inverted to fit in the bottom of the groove. Inverting the lugs allows greater clearance on a shaft or in a housing and forms a higher uniform shoulder good for retaining bearings and other components with large corner radii or chamfers.

==== Beveled retaining rings ====
Beveled retaining rings feature a 15° beveled or angled edge. This angle allows the ring to wedge itself between the groove and the retained part until it can go no farther, effectively “locking” everything in place. Think of placing a cork in a bottle. The cork is forced into the opening until it is wedged as far into the opening as possible. The same thing happens when a beveled retaining ring is installed into an application. The ring is wedging itself into place between the groove wall and the retained part, resulting in what is referred to as rigid end-play take-up.

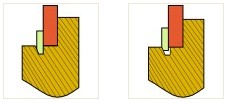
Beveled ring maximum and minimum insertion

==== Bowed retaining rings ====
Bowed retaining rings are curved versions of standard flat internal and external retaining rings and exert a pre-load on an assembly when installed in the groove. This takes up the end-play and acts like a spring, which keeps the assembly in compression.

In manufacturing, parts can not be produced to an exact dimension; as a result, if they are made on the low side of the tolerance, they will be loose or have play on the shaft when a standard ring is installed. If they are made on the high side of the tolerance, they will extend further into the groove and prevent a standard ring from being fully installed. Compensating for accumulated tolerances is what bowed retaining rings are designed to do, by acting as a spring once installed into the groove.

=== Radially assembled ===
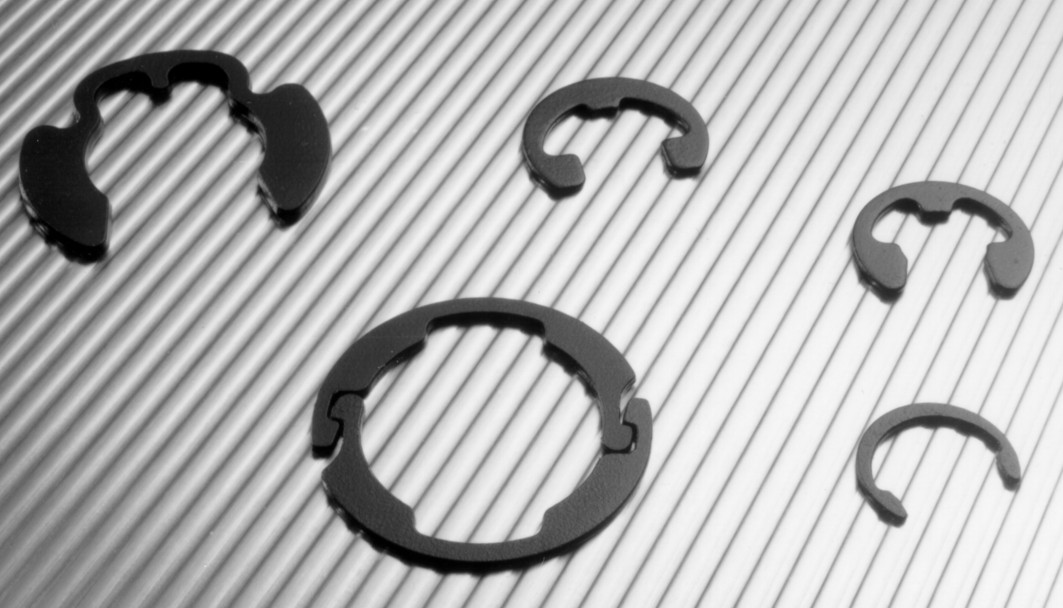
Radially installed e-clips and retaining rings

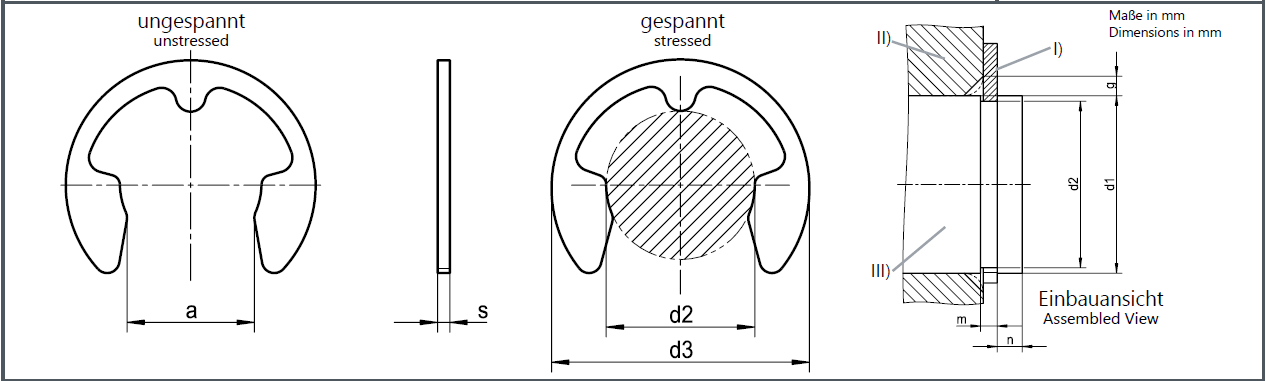
Benzing retaining ring DIN6799

Radially assembled retaining rings are installed externally into machined grooves on a shaft. These rings have no lug holes and must be installed using applicators.

A specific form of radially assembled retaining ring is the Benzing ring (also called Benzing washer), named after its inventor and patent holder, Hugo Benzing. This retaining ring design—manufactured by the Hugo Benzing company—differs from Seeger rings in its construction: Seeger rings (DIN 471/472) are axially installed by elastic deformation into a groove, whereas Benzing rings are installed radially, being pushed onto a shaft; they also have a closed, typically more rounded profile.

=== Self-locking ===
Self-locking retaining rings can be installed in a housing/bore or on a shaft that has not had a groove machined into it. Self-locking rings with no lug holes are impossible to remove without either destroying the ring or warping it out of specified tolerances.

== Constant section retaining rings ==
Constant section retaining rings (snap rings) feature a uniform, constant section. In other words, the material used to make the ring is the same width at any point along the circumference of the ring. When they are contracted or expanded, they take on an elliptical deformation. As a result, they contact the groove at three or more isolated points but never continuously around the periphery. These rings are made from either flat or round wire.

== Spiral retaining rings ==
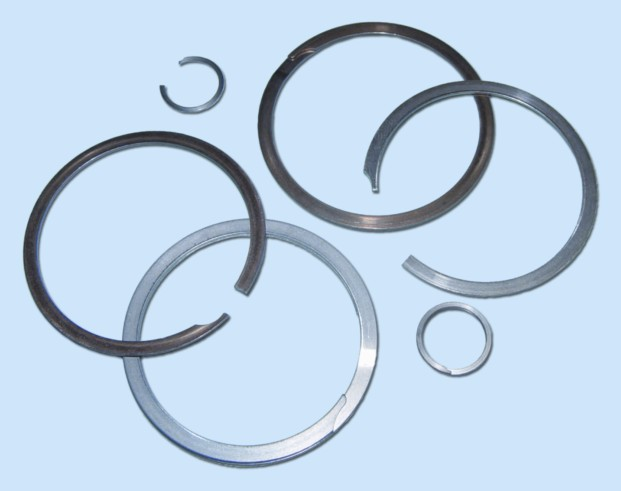
Spiral rings

Spiral retaining rings are axially installed into housings/bores (internal) or onto shafts (external), making 360° contact with the groove. Spiral retaining rings have no ears or lugs to interfere with the assembly. These rings are manufactured by coiling flat wire into the shape of the finished retaining ring. Spiral rings are provided with a removal notch to simplify the removal process. Spiral retaining rings can be economically produced in special alloys like stainless steel because the manufacturing process eliminates scrap.

No special tools are required for installation or removal. Duck bill pliers can be used in installing and removing external spiral rings.

== Circular push-on ==
A circular push-on ring resembles a toothed washer, commonly fabricated in metal. These are installed by pressing onto the end of a grooved shaft, until the nut's inner teeth snap into the groove. The use of push nuts avoids the cost of threading a nut onto the end of the shaft during the manufacturing process.

== Protective finishes ==
The following are various surface finishes used on retaining rings:

- Passivation
- Phosphate
- Zinc plating with subsequent zinc chromate conversion coating
- Oil
- Cadmium plating
