= Taper pin =

Fastener consisting of a conical rod with a shallow taper which is forced into a hole

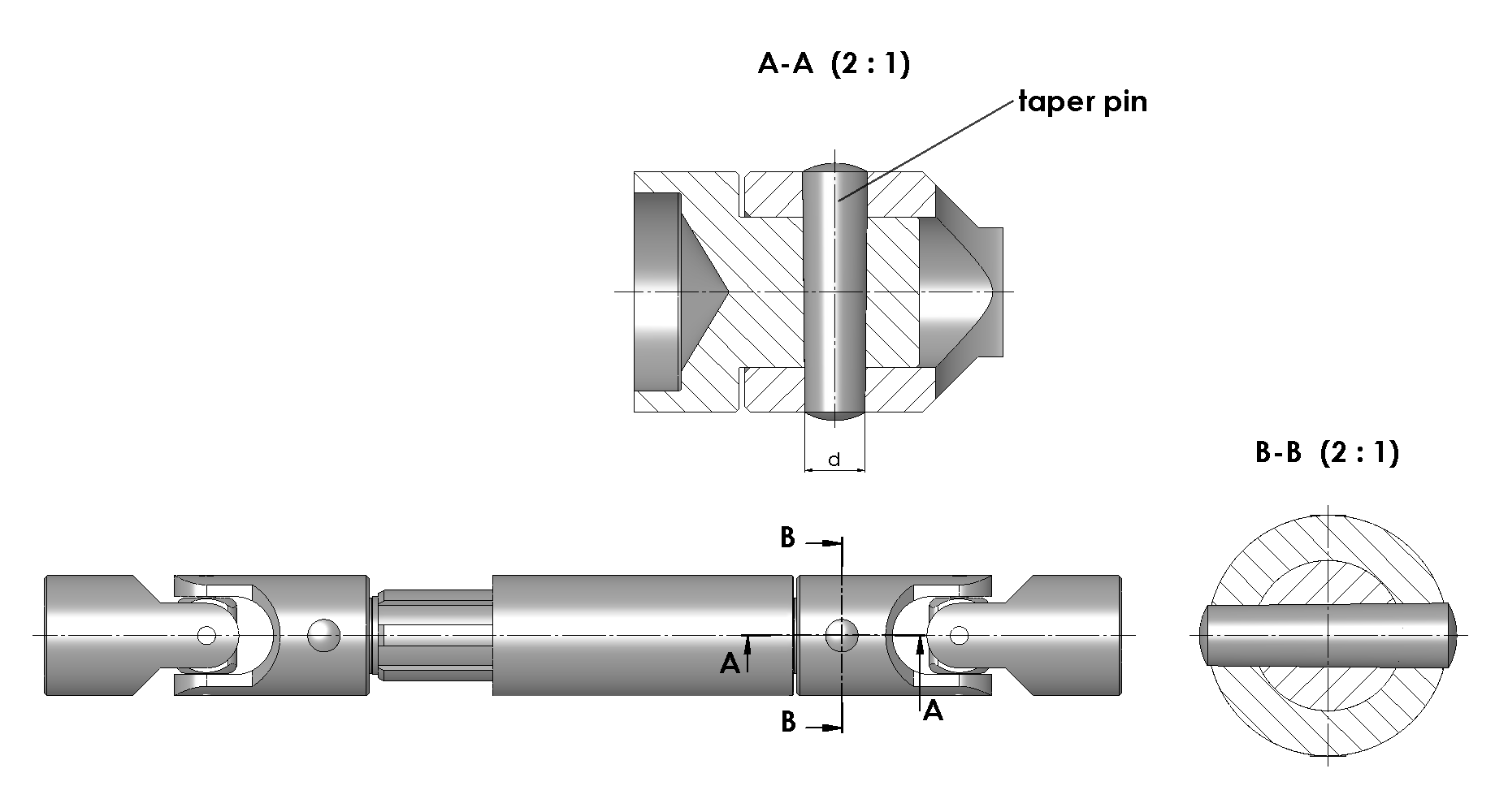
An example of tapered pin used to lock two shafts together.

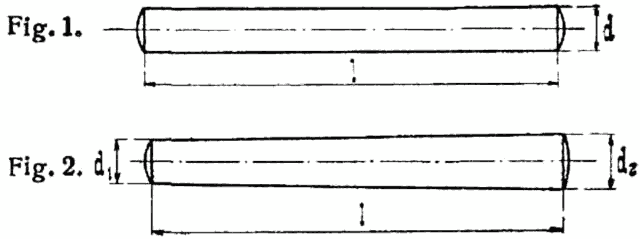
Taper pins were the subject of the first DIN standard, DIN-1

A taper pin is a fastener used in mechanical engineering. They are steel rods with one end having a slightly larger diameter than the other.

== Overview ==
Metric taper pins have a taper of 1:50. A 1:50 taper means that one end of a 50 mm long bar will be 1 mm smaller in diameter than the other end. Inch-sized taper pins have a slightly smaller taper on diameter of 1:48 A 1:48 taper means that one end of a 4-foot long (48 in) bar will be 1 inch smaller in diameter than the other end, or a 1/4-inch taper over a 1-foot length.

== Threaded pins ==
Some taper pins have a male screw thread on the small end that is designed to project through the hole and retain the pin with a washer and a nut. Other pins are threaded on both ends, on the thick end to pull the pin out with the same nut that holds the pin in place.

== Taper pin reamers ==
Taper pin reamers are designed to prepare the hole for taper pins. Metric taper reamers are designated by the small diameter. For example, a 2 mm taper pin reamer has a 1.9 mm small end (2 mm nominal size) and a 2.86 mm large end.

== Clock pins ==
A form of taper pin that precedes these standards is the clock pin, used to accurately and repeatably register parts of a clock to one another. Clock pins do not have a standardised taper, but they generally have a more pronounced taper than the standard engineering pins. The size or gauge is defined by diameter at each end, and the length. The holes are not reamed, but are prepared using a clockmakers' cutting broach to taper a drilled hole.
