= Circlip =

Type of fastener or retaining ring

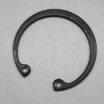
Internal circlip

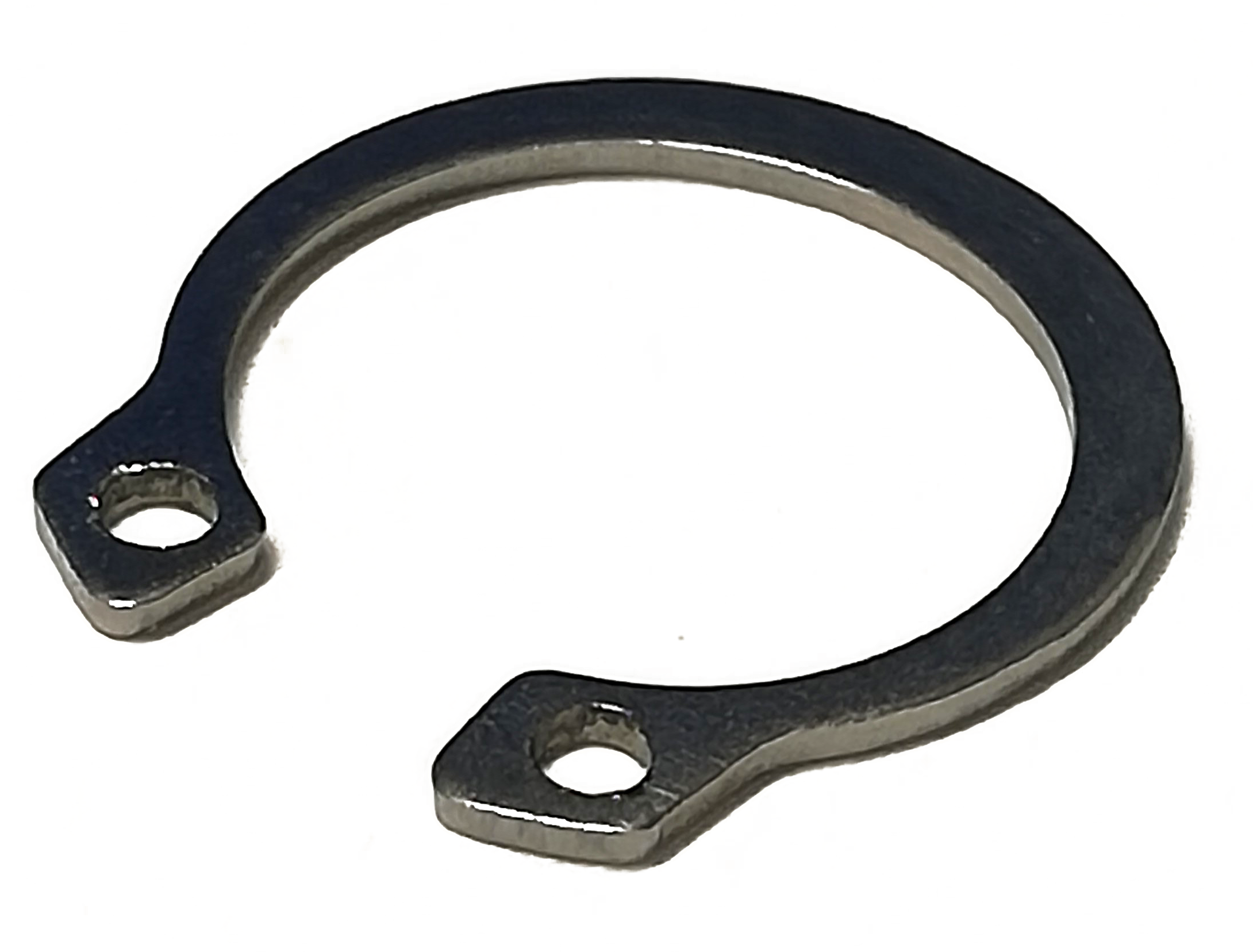
External circlip

A circlip (a portmanteau of "circle" and "clip"), also known as a C-clip, snap ring, or Jesus clip, is a type of fastener or retaining ring that consists of a semi-flexible metal ring with open ends that can be snapped into place into a machined groove on a dowel pin or other part to permit rotation but to prevent axial movement. There are two basic types of circlips: internal (fitted into a bore) and external (fitted over a shaft). Circlips are used to secure pinned connections.

== Details ==
=== E-clip ===
E-clip

Common examples include e-clips (e-rings) and the snap ring (both internal and external) or circlip. These general types of fasteners are sized to provide an interference fit onto (or into, in the case of an internal fastener) a groove or land when in use, such that they must be elastically deformed in order to install or remove them.

== Installation and maintenance ==
This diagram illustrates the removal of a snap ring from the rear hub of a bicycle, on which it is used to retain a single rear sprocket.

The name snap ring generally refers to circlips that have the ends formed to aid installation and removal and are not formed from wire (i.e., do not have a round cross-section). These rings are designed to be installed and removed with special pliers. Some of these special pliers can be configured for internal or external clips, while in other cases, one plier is used for internal clips and another for external clips. For expediency in the field, a pair of needle-nose pliers (for internal clips) or leverage with a flat-headed screwdriver (internal or external) is sometimes used.

Since most snap rings are stamped from sheet steel, one side is slightly rounded and the other has sharp, rough edges. This is due to the stamping die behaving like a cookie cutter and causing a slight rounding of the upper edge of the cut clip. The snap ring must always be installed such that force is transmitted to the retaining groove from the rounded side of the ring, not the rough or square-edged side. If a snap ring is positioned such that its flat side is pressed into the rounded edge of the groove, then when load or force is applied, the flat edge of the snap ring will "bite" into the rounded edge of the retaining groove. The snap ring will distort and ride up the rounded edge, spreading an external snap ring and compressing an internal snap ring. This leaves the clip prone to being forced out of its groove and failing at its retaining function. The accompanying images illustrate the correct orientation of the snap ring in its groove. Wet or dry lubrication is recommended to reduce friction against the circlip and maintain function.

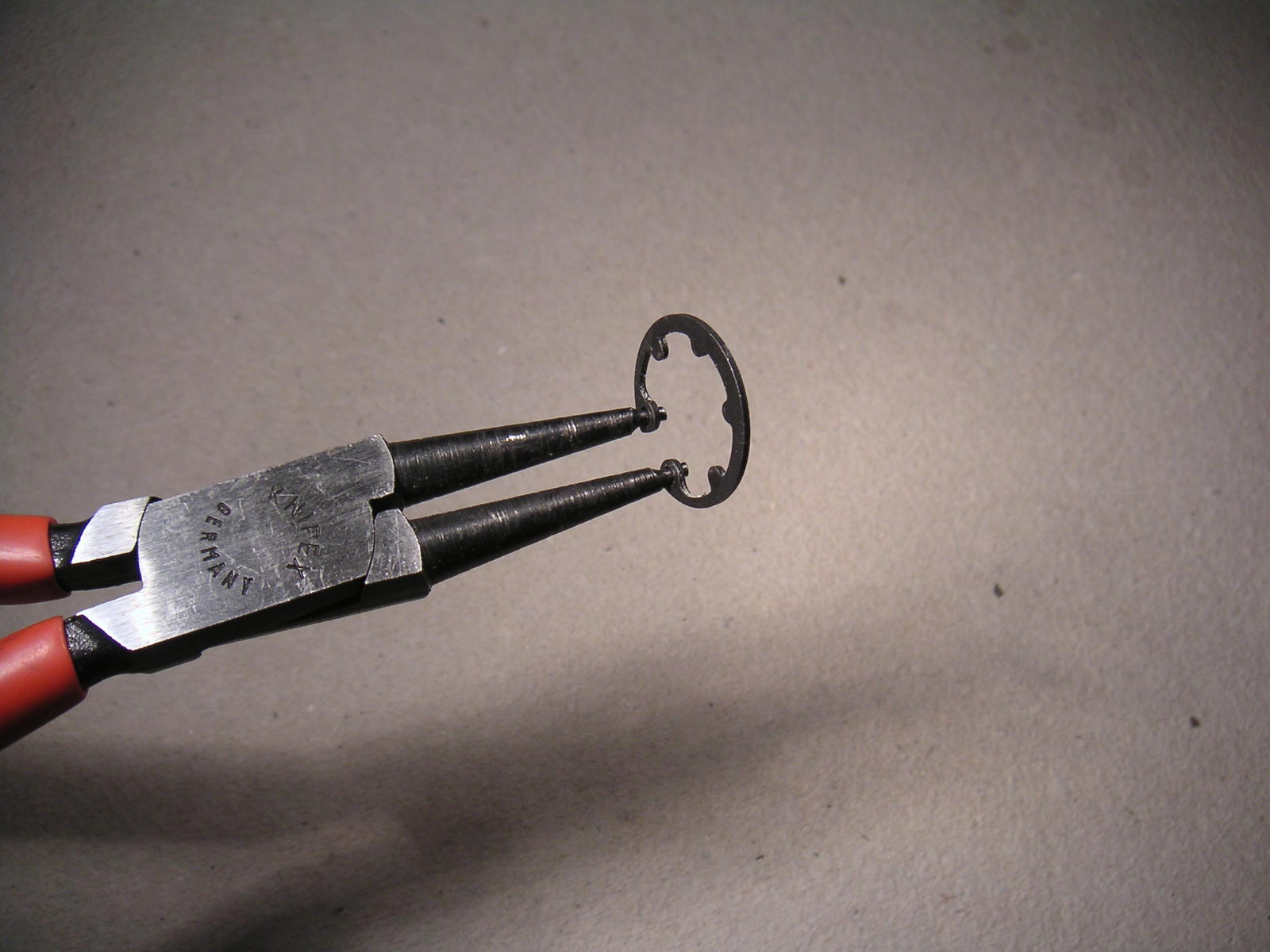
Circlip pliers holding an internal circlip

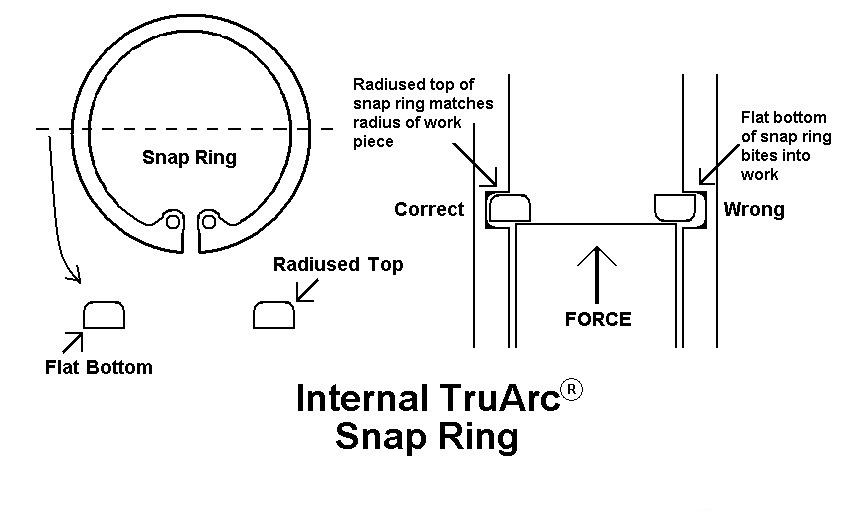
Correct orientation of an internal snap ring in its groove

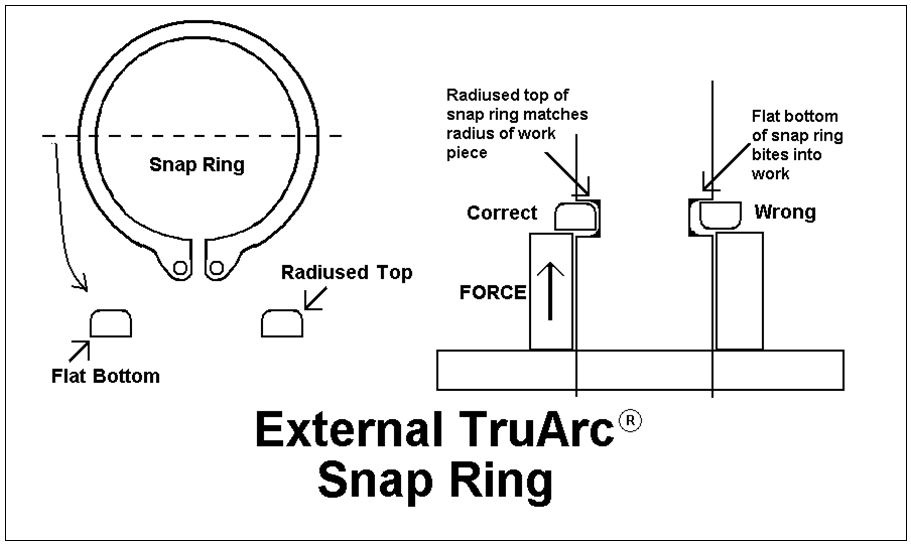
Correct orientation of an external snap ring in its groove
