= Spring pin =

Mechanical fastener

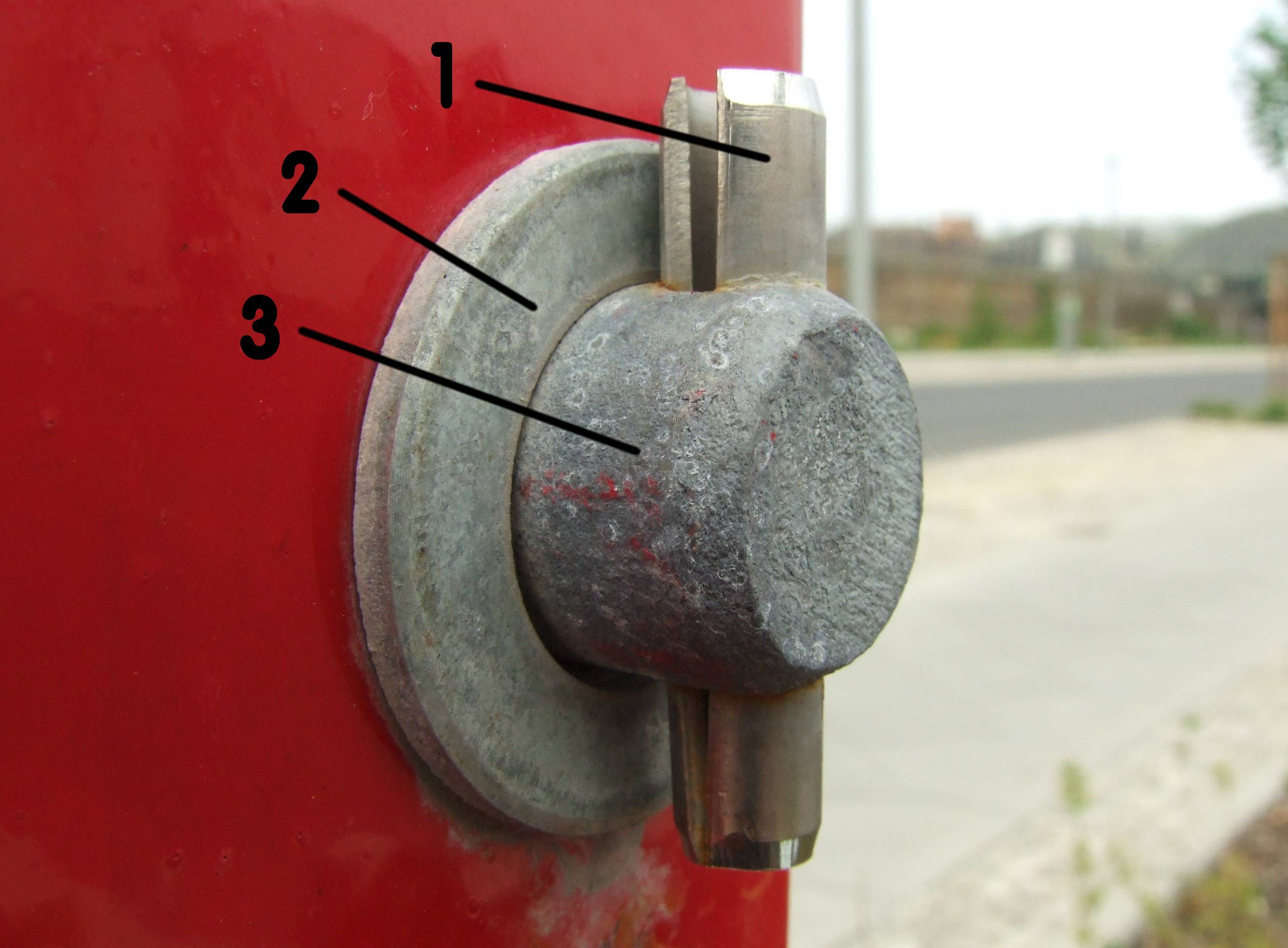
Slotted spring pin (1) and washer (2) used to secure a shaft (3)

A spring pin (also called tension pin or roll pin) is a mechanical fastener that secures the position of two or more parts of a machine relative to each other. Spring pins have a body diameter which is larger than the diameter of the hole they are intended for, and a chamfer on either one or both ends to facilitate starting the pin into the hole. The spring action of the pin allows it to compress as it assumes the diameter of the hole. The force exerted by the pin against the hole wall retains it in the hole, therefore a spring pin is considered a self retaining fastener.

Spring pins may be used to retain a shaft as a journal in a plain bearing, as a type of key to fasten one shaft to another, or to precisely fasten flat faces of mating parts together through symmetric hole locations.

== Types ==
There are two types of spring pins: slotted spring pins and coiled spring pins.

=== Coiled spring pins ===
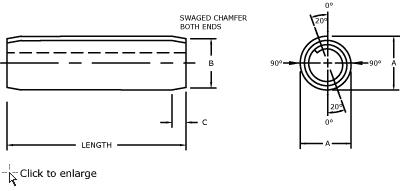
Coiled spring pin

A coiled spring pin, also known as a spiral pin, is a self retaining engineered fastener manufactured by roll forming metal strip into a spiral cross section of 2 1/4 coils. Coiled spring pins have a body diameter larger than the recommended hole diameter and chamfers on both ends to facilitate starting the pin into the hole. The spring action of the pin allows it to compress as it assumes the diameter of the hole.

When coiled spring pins are installed, the compression starts at the outer edge and moves through the coils toward the center. Coiled pins continue to flex after insertion when a load is applied to the pin thus providing excellent performance to counter fatigue in dynamic applications. Coiled spring pins were invented by Herman Koehl circa 1948.

Coiled pins are commercially available in three different duties, standard (ISO 8750), heavy (ISO 8748) and light duty (ISO 8751), which provide for a variety of combinations of strength, flexibility and diameter to suit different mating host materials and performance requirements. Typical materials for coiled spring pins include high-carbon steel, stainless steel and alloy 6150.

Coiled pins are used extensively in cosmetic cases, automotive door handles and locks, and latches as hinge pins. They are also used as pivots and axles, for alignment and stopping, to fasten multiple components together—such as a gear and shaft—and even as ejector pins to remove motherboards from PCs. The automotive and electrical industries use coiled pins in such products as steering boxes and columns, pumps, electric motors and circuit breakers.

=== Slotted spring pins ===
Slotted spring pin

Slotted spring pins are cylindrical pins rolled from a strip of material with a slot to allow the pin to have some flexibility during insertion. Slotted spring pins are also known as roll pins, sellock pins or "C" pins.

=== International Standards ===
- Slotted spring pins: ISO 8752
- Standard Duty: UNE–EN-ISO 8750, NASM10971, NASM51923, NAS1407, ASME B18.8.2, ASME B18.8.3M
- Heavy Duty: UNE–EN-ISO 8748, NASM10971, NASM39086, NAS561, ASME B18.8.2, ASME B18.8.3M
- Light Duty: UNE–EN-ISO 8751, NASM10971, NASM51987, NAS1407, ASME B18.8.2, ASME B18.8.3M
- Standard duty coiled spring pins offer the best balance between flexibility and strength and are recommended for most applications.
- Heavy duty coiled spring pins are typically used in high shear strength applications and hardened host materials.
- Light duty pins are used in applications with soft metals and plastics holes where there is a high risk of enlarging or breaking the host using a traditional press fit solid pin.
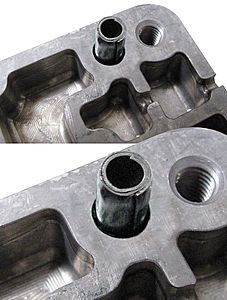
Coiled spring pin as an alignment pin in aluminum castings

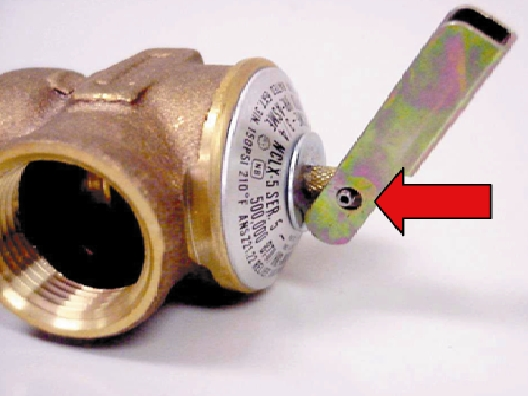
Coiled spring pin secures the lift lever relative to the valve rod.

== See also ==
- Circlip – Type of fastener or retaining ring
- Split pin – Metal fastener with two tines that are bent during installation
- Spring plunger, spring-loaded device for indexing, locating, positioning, or locking components against a pin or ball by means of spring force
