= Circle cotter =

Ring type of retaining component

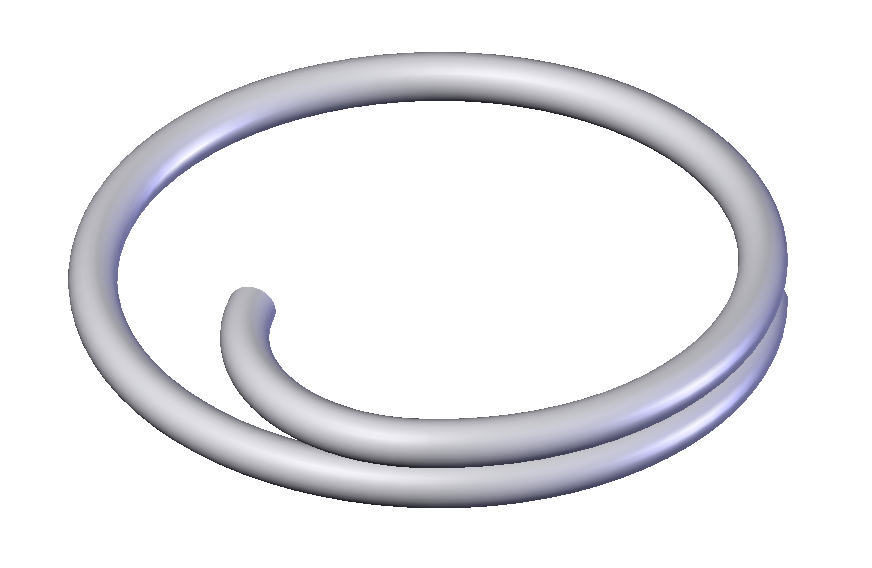
A circle cotter

A circle cotter, also known as a cotter ring or split ring, is a formed wire fastener that is shaped like a circle, hence the name. The open end of the wire is in the middle of the cotter so when it is installed the inner tab is first installed in the hole. Because of this feature it is often used in applications where a sharp edge cannot be tolerated, such as fabric applications.

== Kickout ring ==
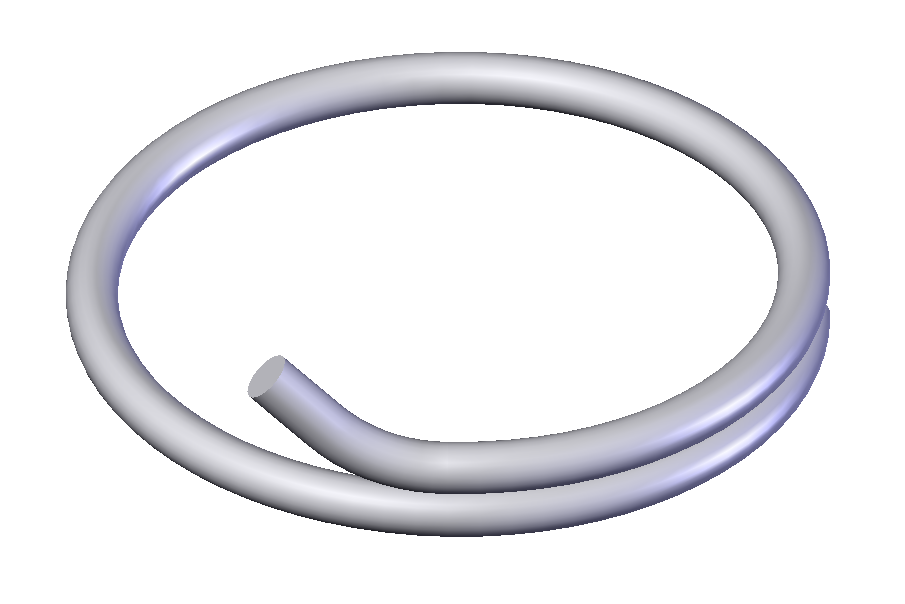
A kickout ring

A very similar type of fastener is the kickout ring, which bends the open tab upward instead of inward.
