= Hairpin clip =

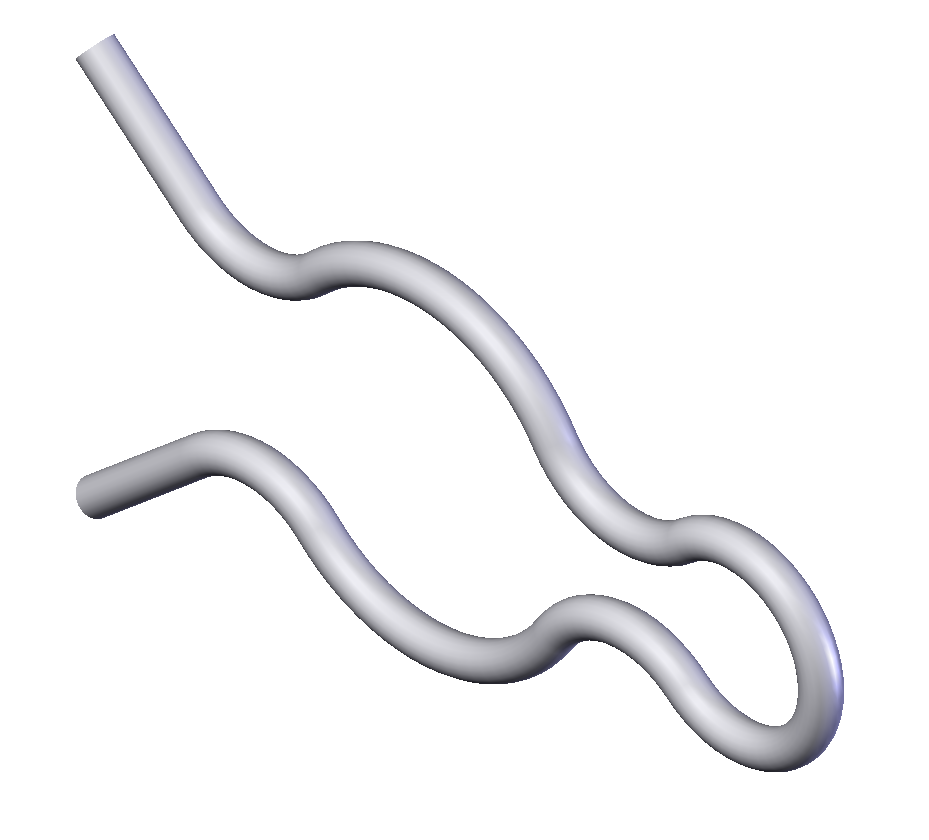

A hairpin clip, also known as a retaining pin, is a type of formed wire used on a grooved shaft. It is designed to be easily installed and uninstalled, and is reusable. They are commonly made from 1050 carbon steel and 300 series stainless steel.
