= Clevis fastener =

Fastener consisting of a U-shaped bracket through which a pin is placed

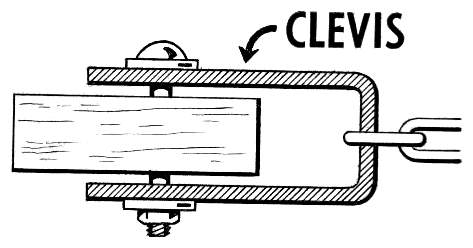
A clevis used to attach a bar and chain

A clevis and clevis pin, held in place by a split pin

A clevis fastener is a two-piece fastener system consisting of a clevis and a clevis pin head.

== Terms ==
The clevis is a U-shaped piece that has holes at the end of the prongs to accept the clevis pin. The clevis pin is similar to a bolt, but is either partially threaded or unthreaded with a cross-hole for a split pin. A tang is a piece that is sometimes fitted in the space within the clevis and is held in place by the clevis pin. The combination of a simple clevis fitted with a pin is commonly called a shackle, although a clevis and pin is only one of the many forms a shackle may take.

== Usage ==
Clevises are used in a wide variety of fasteners used in farming equipment and sailboat rigging, as well as the automotive, aircraft, and construction industries. They are also widely used to attach control surfaces and other accessories to servo controls in airworthy model aircraft. As a part of a fastener, a clevis provides a method of allowing rotation in some axes while restricting rotation in others.

== Clevis pin ==
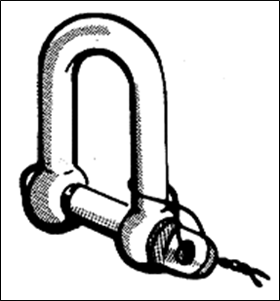
A moused shackle

There are two main types of clevis pins: threaded and unthreaded. Unthreaded clevis pins have a domed head at one end and a cross-hole at the other end. A cotter pin (US usage) or split pin is used to keep the clevis pin in place. Threaded clevis pins have a partially threaded shank on one end and a formed head on the other. The formed head has a lip, which acts as a stop when threading the pin into the shackle, and a flattened tab with a cross-hole. The flattened tab allows for easy installation of the pin and the cross-hole allows the pin to be moused.

A bolt can function as a clevis pin, but a bolt is not intended to take the lateral stress that a clevis pin must handle. Normal bolts are manufactured to handle tension loads, whereas clevis pins and bolts are designed to withstand shearing forces. The shearing strength of a threaded bolt is determined by its inner thread diameter.

Clevis pins should be closely fitted to the holes in the clevis to limit wear and reduce the failure rate of either the pin or the clevis.

== Twist clevis ==
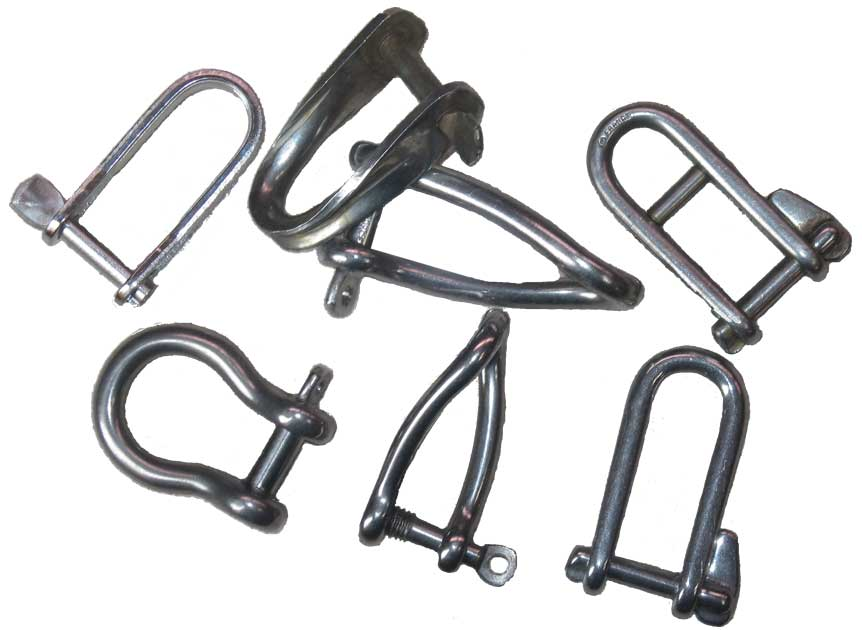
An assortment of shackles, with twist clevises in the middle

A twist shackle provides a loop at a right angle to the axis of rotation. Older farming implements intended to be pulled by a team of draft animals often require a twist shackle to be hitched.

== Clevis hanger ==
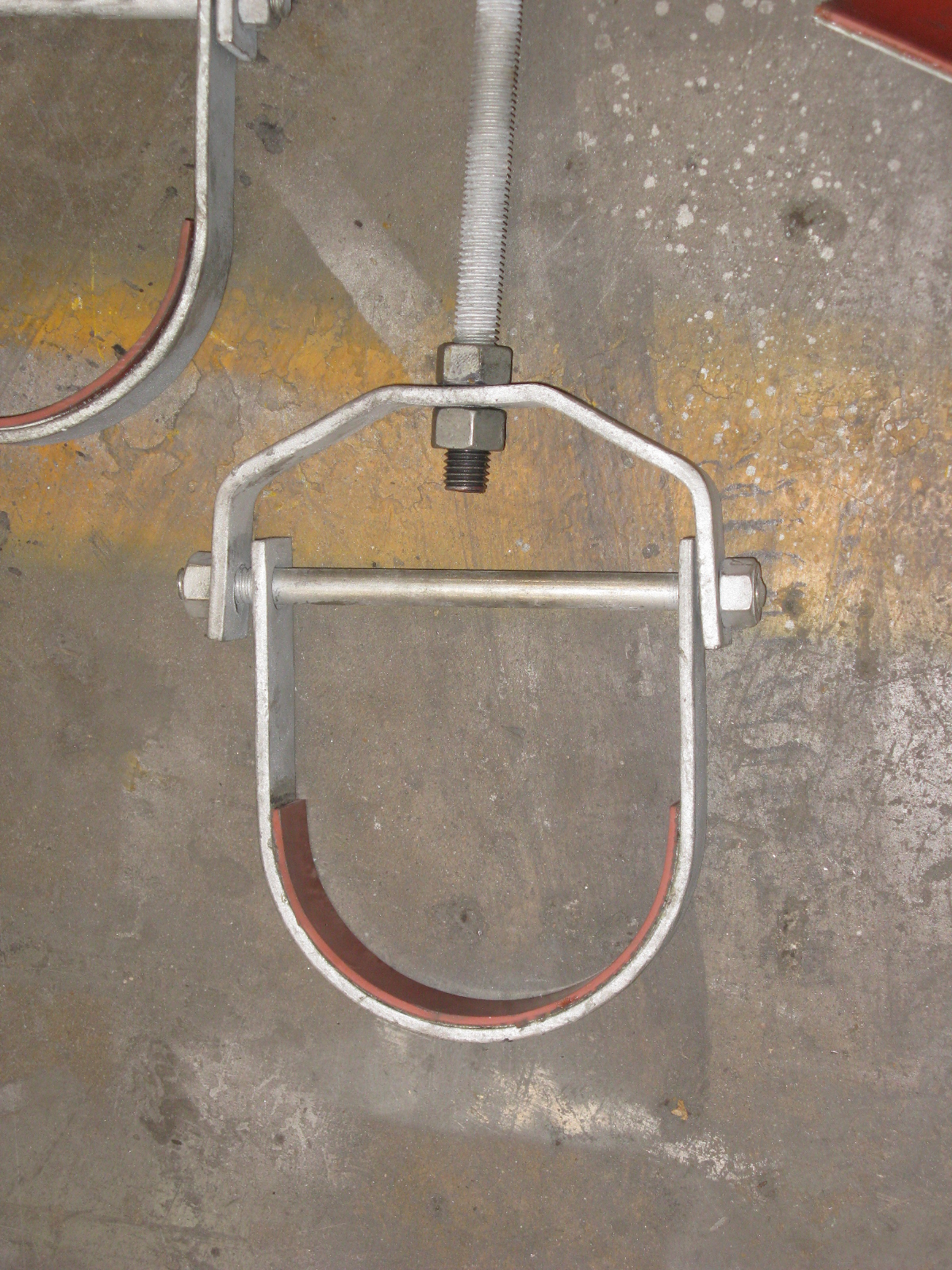
Clevis hanger

A clevis hanger consists of one U-shaped clevis and a second V-shaped clevis with a hole in a flattened section at the base of the V, joined together with a bolt or pin. Clevis hangers are used as a pipe attachment providing vertical adjustment for pipes.

== Clevis bracket ==
A clevis bracket generally takes the form of a solid metal piece with a flat rectangular base, fitted with holes for bolts or machine screws, and two rounded wings in parallel forming a clevis. Commonly used in aircraft and cars, clevis brackets allow mounting of rods to flat surfaces.

== Clevis hook ==
A clevis hook is a hook, with or without a snap lock, with a clevis and bolt or pin at the base. The clevis is used to fasten the hook to a bracket or chain.

== Clevis rod end ==
A clevis rod end is a folded or machined piece formed into a clevis and fitted with a hole at its base to which a rod is attached. In machined pieces, the hole is most often threaded.

== Twin clevis ==
A twin clevis is a solid piece with two clevises directly opposite one another, each fitted with a pin. Twin clevises are commonly used to join two lengths of chain.
