= Fit =

Fit or FIT may refer to:

== Health and medicine ==
- Epileptic seizure
- Feature integration theory
- Fecal immunochemical test
- Physical fitness
  - Physical attractiveness (colloquial)
- Tantrum

== Education ==
- Fashion Institute of Technology, in New York City, United States
- Florida Institute of Technology, in Melbourne, Florida, United States
- Fortune Institute of Technology, in Kaohsiung, Taiwan
- Fukuoka Institute of Technology, in Fukuoka, Japan
- Faculty of Information Technology, in Prague, Czech Republic

== Entertainment ==
- Fitt (poetry), also spelled 'fit', a division of Old and Middle English poetry
- Fit (film), a 2010 British film
- FitTV, a cable television network
- Wii Fit, a 2007 video game
- Fit, in contract bridge
- Fit (TV series), a CBBC original series; see 2013 in British television

== Mathematics ==
- Curve fitting
- Finite integration technique
- First isomorphism theorem
- Five intersecting tetrahedra

== Sport ==
- FIT (Federazione Italiana Tennis)

== Technology ==
- Fit (manufacturing)
- Engineering fit
- Failures in time, or failure rate
- FITS (Flexible Image Transport System), a digital file format using the filename extension .fit among others
- Flight interception trap
- Framework for integrated test, a software tool
- Google Fit
- Honda Fit, a hatchback

== Other uses ==
- Direction of fit
- Chrissie Fit (born 1984), American actress
- Feed-in tariff, a policy mechanism designed to accelerate investment in renewable energy
- Filton Abbey Wood railway station, in England
- Federation of International Touch, governing touch rugby
- Fields in Trust, a British environmental organization
- Fitchburg Municipal Airport, FAA LIT code "FIT"
- Flanders Investment and Trade, an agency of the government of Flanders, Belgium
- Forward Intelligence Team, a British police unit
- Fraunhofer Institute for Applied Information Technology, a German research institute
- International Federation of Translators (French: Fédération Internationale des Traducteurs), a professional organization
- Meänkieli dialects of the Finnish language
- Workers' Left Front (Spanish: Frente de Izquierda y de los Trabajadores), a political alliance in Argentina
- Tantrum
- Outfit, as in clothing

== See also ==
- Fitness (disambiguation)
- Fit-fit, Eritrean/Ethiopian food dish
