= Fits =

Fits may refer to:

- FITS, a data format in astronomy
- FITS (board game), a 2009 board game
- Fits (album), a 2009 album by White Denim
- The Fits, an album by Aly Tadros
- The Fits, a British punk rock band
- The Fits (film), a 2015 American drama film
- Fury in the Slaughterhouse, a German rock band

== See also ==
- Fit (disambiguation)
- FITSNews
