= RC9 =

RC9 may refer to:

- 1977 RC_{9}
- 1991 RC_{9}
- Engineering fit#RC8 and RC9: Loose Running Fits
- Route Coloniale 9
- A MMPI scale
