= Key (engineering) =

Machine element used to connect a rotating element to a shaft

In mechanical engineering, a key is a machine element used to connect a rotating machine element to a shaft. The key prevents relative rotation between the two parts and enable torque transmission. For a key to function, the shaft and rotating machine element must have a keyway and a keyseat, which is a slot and pocket in which the key fits. The whole system is called a keyed joint. A keyed joint may allow relative axial movement between the parts.

Commonly keyed components include gears, pulleys, couplings, and washers.

== Types ==
There are five main types of keys: sunk, saddle, tangent, round, and spline.

=== Sunk key ===
Types of sunk keys: rectangular, square, parallel sunk, gib-head, feather, and Woodruff.

==== Parallel keys ====
Parallel keys are the most widely used. They have a square or rectangular cross-section. Square keys are used for smaller shafts and rectangular faced keys are used for shaft diameters over 6.5 in (170 mm) or when the wall thickness of the mating hub is an issue. Set screws often accompany parallel keys to lock the mating parts into place. The keyway is a longitudinal slot in both the shaft and mating part.

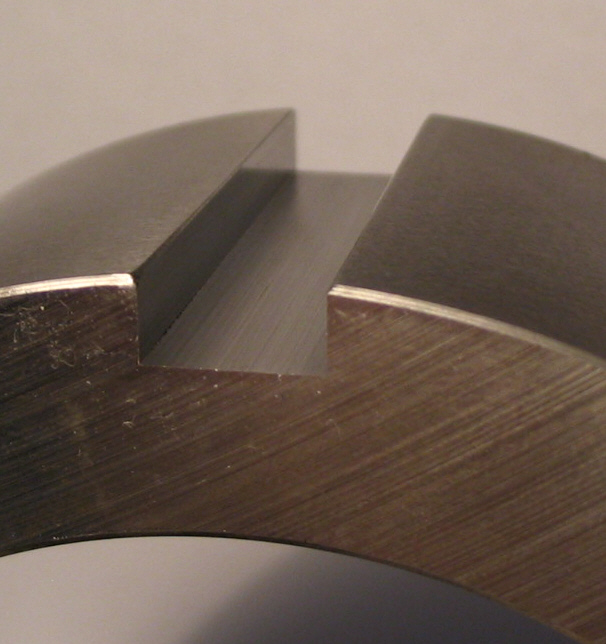
The keyseat in a shaft for a parallel key

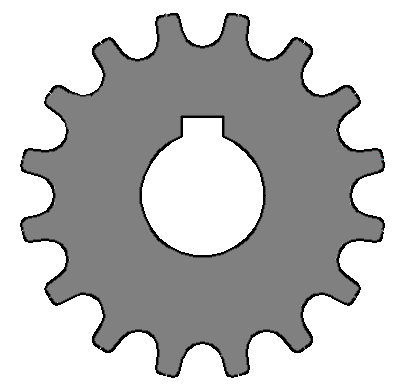
A sprocket with an internal parallel keyway

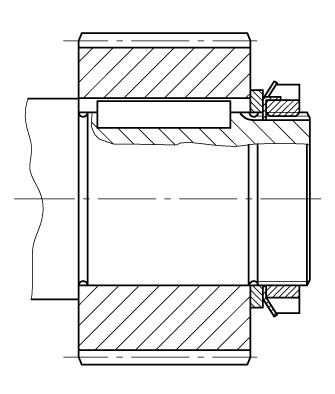
Cross-section of a parallel keyed joint

W = d/4
H = 2d/3

where

- W is the key width
- H is the key height
- d is the shaft diameter

==== Woodruff keys ====
Woodruff keys are semicircular, fitting partly into a circular segment keyway with the remainder fitting into a longitudinal slot keyway in the mating part. The circular segment can be cut directly by plunge cutting with a circular Woodruff cutter without any reliefs. The main advantage of the Woodruff key is the elimination of milling near shaft shoulders, where stress concentrations, and concentricity would be affected. The latter is particularly important for high speed operation. The more exact fit of the key and keyway also reduces play, and stress concentrations in, and improves the reliability of the key. An additional advantage is a stuck key can be removed from a shaft with a hammer blow, the circular profile will push the key out of the slot, as opposed to a standard key which will need to be pushed axially, or pulled out of its slot. Common applications include machine tools, automotive applications, snowblowers and marine propellers.

This type of key was developed by William N. Woodruff of Hartford Connecticut. In 1888, he was awarded the John Scott Medal by the Franklin Institute for his invention.

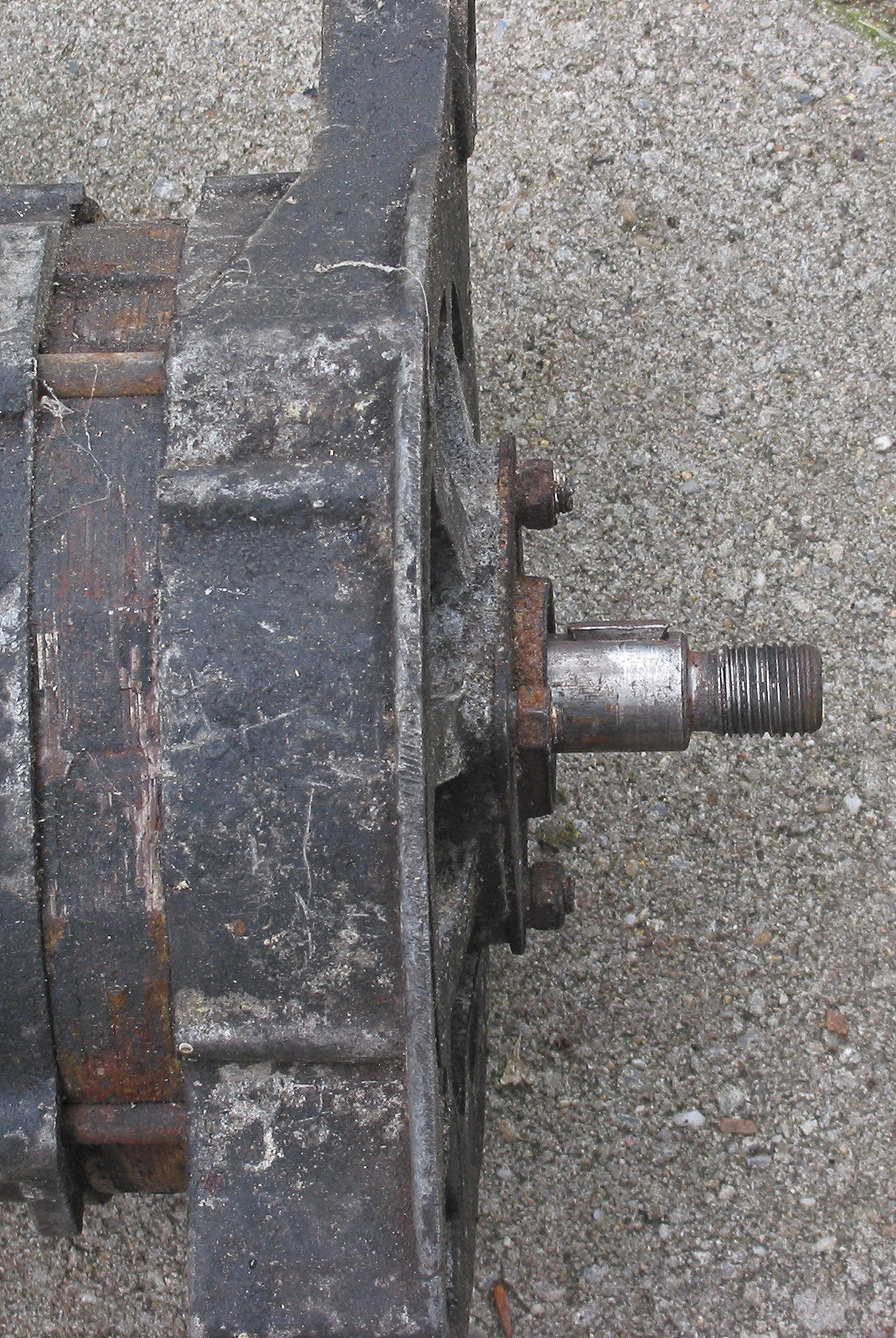
A Woodruff key installed

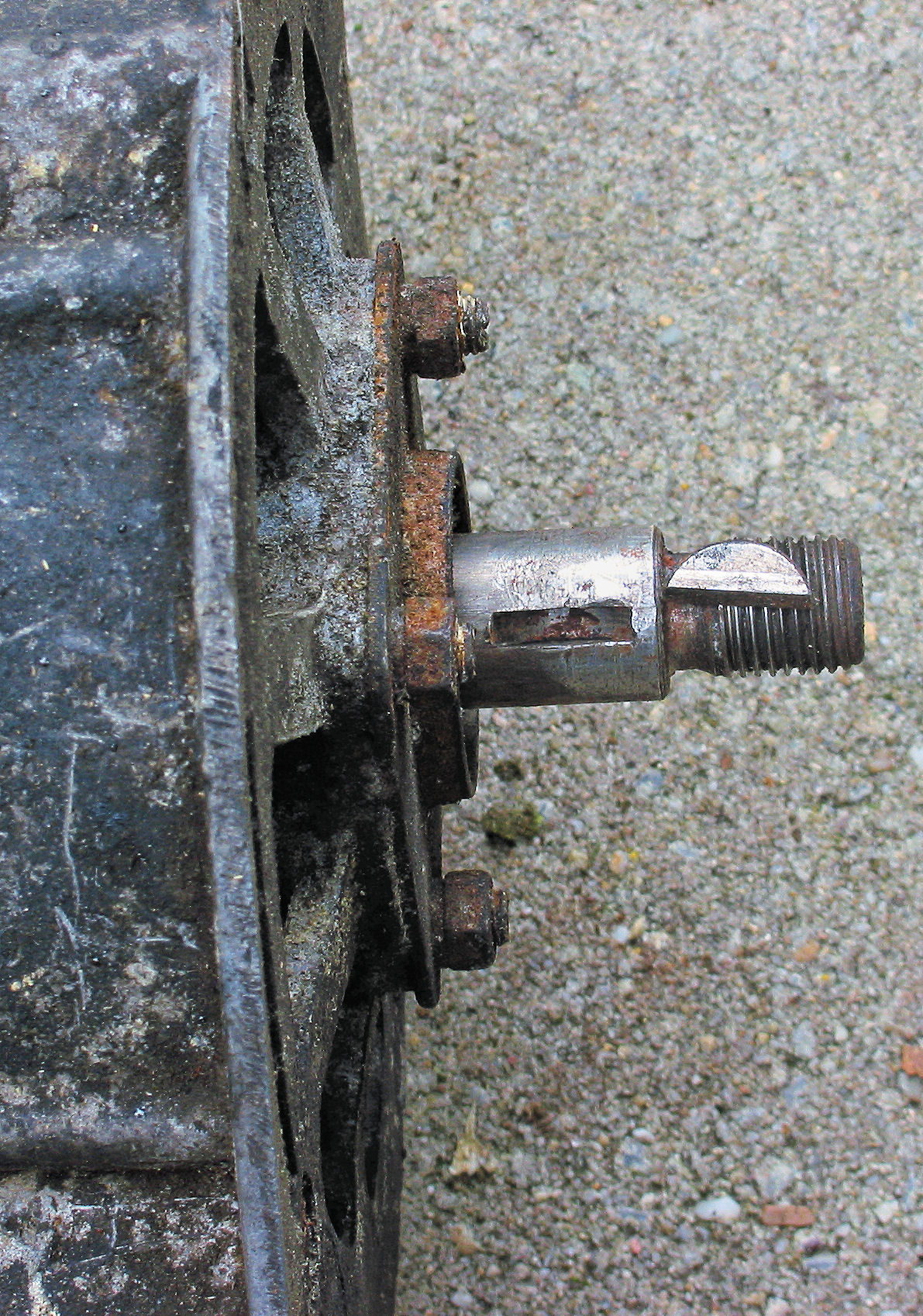
A Woodruff key and keyway

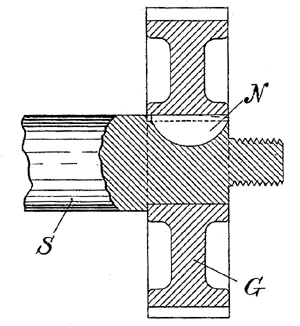
Gear G is positively located on shaft S by Woodruff key N.

==== Tapered keys ====
The tapered key is tapered only on the side that engages the hub. The keyway in the hub has a taper that matches that of the tapered key. Some taper keys have a gib, or tab, for easy removal during disassembly. The purpose of the taper is to secure the key itself, as well as to firmly engage the shaft to the hub without the need for a set screw. The problem with taper keys is that they can cause the center of the shaft rotation to be slightly off of the mating part. It is different from a tapered shaft lock in that tapered keys have a matching taper on the keyway, while tapered shaft locks do not.

==== Others ====
A Scotch key or Dutch key features a circular keyway hole (instead of rectangular), produced by drilling axially into the assembled hub and shaft, with a metal dowel pin serving as the key. If the hole and key are tapered, the key is referred to as a Dutch pin, which is driven in and optionally finished by cutting or grinding flush with the end of the shaft. If a straight Dutch keyway hole is optionally tapped with a thread, then an ordinary screw serves as the threaded Dutch key.

Spring pins are an alternative Dutch key component, instead of solid dowel pins. A spring pin is self-fastening and does not work loose under vibration. Hollow spring pins provide a weaker shear strength than a solid dowel pin, and the strength may be varied by varying the wall thickness. This limited shear strength specification is designed to sustain normal operation, but then give way in the event of excessive shaft torque, thus protecting the rest of the machine from damage.

Introducing an additional bushing component between hub and shaft improves the performance and convenience of keyed joints. Taper-Lock bushings are keyed hub fittings which provide three threaded Dutch keyways and two setscrews as Dutch keys, in addition to the rectangular keyway. The Dutch keyways are threaded only on the alternate hub side or shaft side, with a thread clearance hole form on the opposite side. By simply driving setscrews into selected holes, the hub mechanism conveniently operates to rigidly lock or definitely release from the shaft, without hammering or hub-pulling. Quick-disconnect (QD) bushings work similarly, but place a circular pattern of three unthreaded and three fully threaded holes further out from the shaft axis on a bushing flange, instead of across the bushing-to-hub interface.

A Hirth joint is similar to a spline joint but with the teeth on the end of the shaft instead of on the surface.

=== Saddle keys ===
These types of keys are generally attached to the driving member (e.g. shafts). These types of keys have less strength as compared with the sunk keys. These are rarely used keys, to transmit lower power to the driven members (e.g. couplings)

=== Tangent keys ===
Tangent keys are used in high-torque heavy-duty applications. What would have been the side of each keyway forms heels against which the key sits, and transfers force compressively. This latter point means that for reversible motion of the shaft, another key along a tangent outwards in the opposing direction is needed. Typically this will be offset by 90° or 180° on the shaft. The key may be wedge, rectangular, or square shaped, but particularly rectangular double-taper keys are used.

=== Spline key ===
This type of key uses multiple keyways in the hub to transmit high power.

== Keyseating ==
Keyseating is the creation of the slots in the mating items. Keyseating can be done on a variety of different machines including a broach, a keyseater, wire-cut EDM, a shaper or vertical slotting machine, either a vertical or horizontal mill, or with a chisel and file.

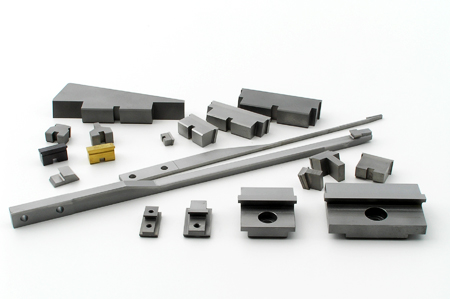
Keyway cutters

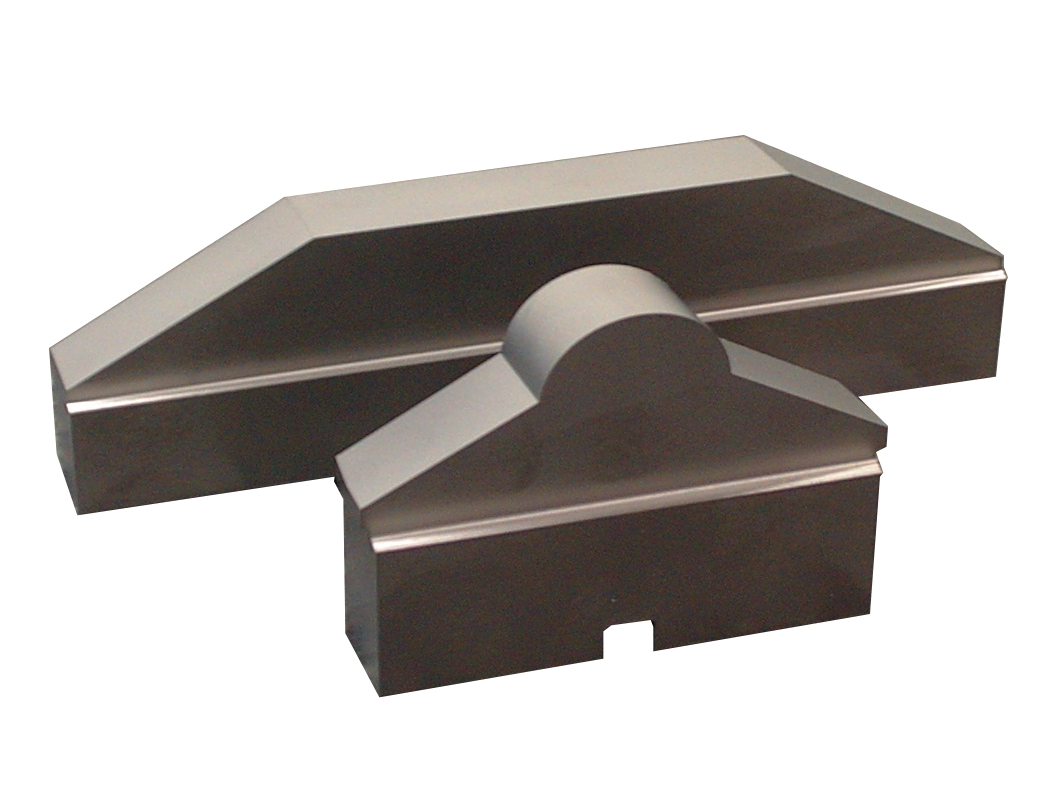
Special cutters

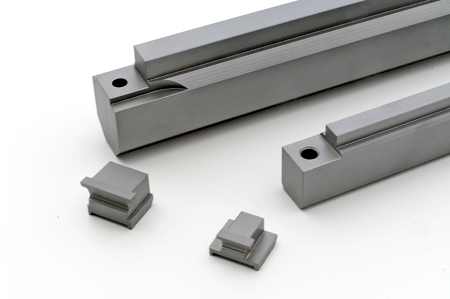
Slotting tools

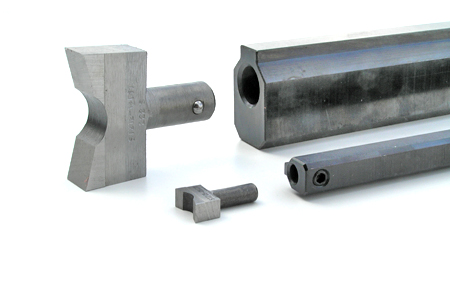
Different slotting tools

=== Broaching ===
Broaching is primarily used to cut square cornered internal keyways. The specific broach, bushing and guide are used for each given keyway cross-section, which makes this process more expensive than most of the alternatives. However, it can produce the most accurate keyway out of all the processes. There are three main steps in broaching a keyway: First, the workpiece is set on the arbor press and the bushing is placed in the opening of the workpiece. Next, the broach is inserted and pushed through, cutting the keyway. Finally, shims are placed between the bushing and the broach to achieve the correct depth necessary for the key.

=== Keyseater ===
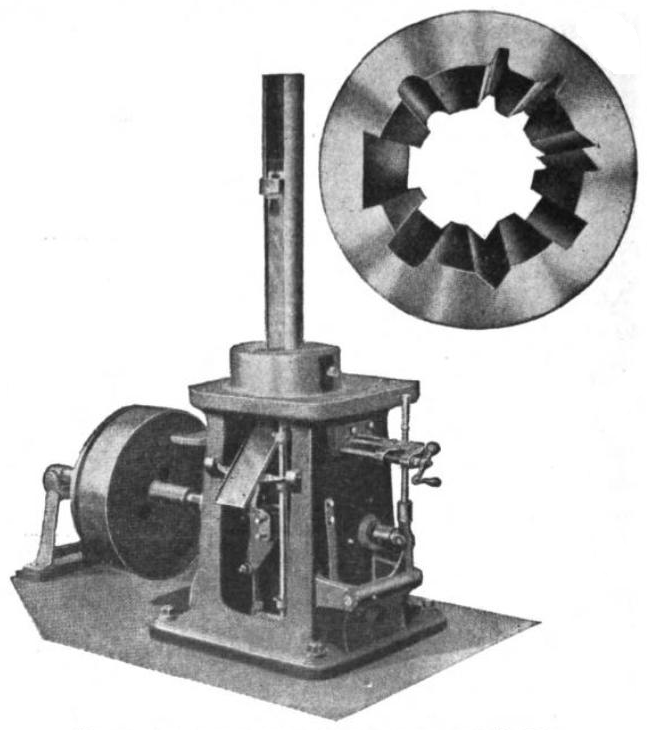
A keyseater and a sample of various shapes that can be cut

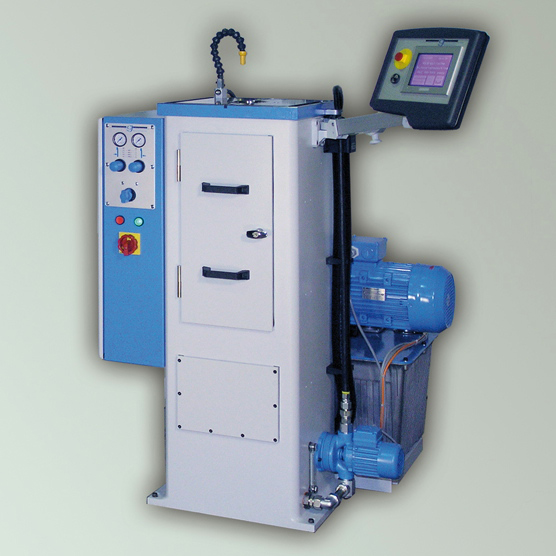
Modern keyseating machine

Keyseaters, also known as keyseating machines and keyway cutters, are specialized machines designed to cut keyways. They are very similar to vertical shapers; the difference is that the cutting tool on a keyseater enters the workpiece from the bottom and cuts on the down-stroke, while the tool on a shaper enters the workpiece from the top and cuts downward. Another difference is a keyseater has a guiding system above the workpiece to minimize deflection, which results in a closer tolerance cut. The process starts by clamping the workpiece to the table with a fixture or vise. The workpiece is properly located and then the reciprocating arm is started. Some models have a stationary table so the cutter is fed horizontally into the workpiece, while others have a movable table that feeds the workpiece into a fixed cutter. These machines can cut other straight sided features other than keyways (see the picture). They can also produce blind slots, which are slots that do not extend through the whole workpiece.

=== Wire-cut electrical-discharge machining (EDM) ===
Wire-cut electrical-discharge machining (EDM) is primarily used for small production lot sizes where either extreme precision is required or other cutting technologies are not readily available. Wire-cut EDM cuts keyways by eroding material away from the workpiece through a series of rapid electric current discharges between a spooling wire and the workpiece through a dielectric liquid. Computer numerical control (CNC) wire-cut EDM machines allow for a wide variety selection of keyways to be cut, inclusive of multiple keyways on the same hub. The main limitations of CNC wire-cut EDM is the time it takes to cut a keyway as well as the size of parts a given wire-cut EDM machine can accommodate.

=== Shaping or slotting ===
Shaping or slotting is largely used for cutting keyways that do not extend through the full length of the part. Like keyseating, shaping uses a single-point cutting tool for cutting, however, shapers are not guided through the cut on a fixed post. As such, shaper cuts are generally more susceptible to deflection than keyseater cuts.

=== Milling ===
Parallel, tapered, and Woodruff keyways can be produced on a milling machine. End mills or slotting cutters are used for parallel and tapered keyways, while a Woodruff cutter is used for Woodruff keyways.

For internal keyways that are not too long, the keyways can be milled if a radius is acceptable.

=== Chiseling ===
One of the earliest forms of keyseating was done by chiseling. The keyway is roughed out using a chisel and then filed to size; the key is tried frequently to avoid over filing. This technique is long, tedious, and rarely used anymore.

== Keyed joints ==
A shear key is a feature intended to fail and avoid further damage should the machinery be accidentally operated in excess of its design limits. Shear keys may be any of the designs described above, but are made from a weaker material than the shaft. The shear key is easily and inexpensively replaced, and avoids more serious damage to the mechanism that would be costly or difficult to repair. For example, a steel shaft and pulley may employ a brass key. When excessive torque is applied to the joint, the steel edges shear the brass key into two pieces, leaving the pulley spinning loosely on the shaft and relieving the rest of the machine from possible damage.

Two parallel keys can be used if the shaft connection requires a higher torque rating.

Improperly machined keyways that had cutter deflection or drifting occur, may not be strong enough for the required application.

== See also ==
- Coupling
