= Staking (manufacturing) =

Process of connecting two components

Staking is the process of connecting two components by creating an interference fit between the two pieces. One workpiece has a hole in it while the other has a boss that fits within the hole. The boss is very slightly undersized so that it forms a slip fit. A staking punch is then used to expand the boss radially and to compress the boss axially so as to form an interference fit between the workpieces. This forms a permanent joint.

== Thermoplastic staking ==
Thermoplastic staking, also known as heat staking, is the same process except that it uses heat to deform the plastic boss, instead of cold forming. A plastic stud protruding from one component fits into a hole in the second component. The stud is then deformed through the softening of the plastic to form a head which mechanically locks the two components together. It is a versatile technique benefiting from being quick, economical and consistent. Unlike welding techniques, staking has the capacity to join plastics to other materials (e.g. metal, PCBs) in addition to joining like or dissimilar plastics, and it has the advantage over other mechanical joining methods in eliminating the need for consumables such as rivets and screws.

=== Technology ===
Thermoplastic staking can be performed with a wide variety of technologies, including:

- Thermal tooling
- Thermal punch (or hot punch)
- Hot air cold upset
- Ultrasonic staking
- Cold forming
- Infrared staking
- Impulse staking
