= John Oldham (engineer) =

- Born: 1779; Dublin, Ireland
- Died: 1840 (aged 60–61)
- Known for: The Oldham coupler

John Oldham (1779–1840) was an Irish engineer, now best known for the Oldham coupler.

== Life ==
Born in Dublin, Oldham was apprenticed to an engraver there, but then became a miniature-painter. He invented a numbering machine, which in 1809 he unsuccessfully offered to the bank of Newry for numbering their banknotes. In 1812 the machine was adopted by the Bank of Ireland, and he received the appointment of engineer and chief engraver.

In 1837 Oldham entered the service of the Bank of England, where he introduced improvements in the machinery for printing and numbering banknotes. This machinery continued in use until 1852–3, when the system of surface-printing was adopted. He died at his house in Montagu Street, Russell Square, London, on 14 February 1840.

== Engineer ==
Oldham also paid attention to marine propulsion, and in 1817 he obtained a patent (No. 4169) for propelling ships by means of paddles worked by a steam-engine, an attempt to imitate the motion of a paddle when used by a human. In 1820 he patented a further improvement (No. 4249), the paddles being placed on a shaft across the ship, and caused to revolve, being feathered by an adaptation of the gearing used in the former patent. It was used in the Aaron Manby, the first seagoing iron ship. A further development of the idea resulted in the construction of a feathering paddle-wheel, which was patented in 1827 (No. 5455).

Oldham's system of warming buildings, introduced into the Bank of Ireland, and subsequently into the Bank of England, was described in the Civil Engineer and Architect's Journal, 1839, p. 96.

== Family ==
Oldham left a family of 17 children. His eldest son, Thomas Oldham (1801–1851), succeeded to his father's place at the bank. He was elected an associate of the Institution of Civil Engineers on 2 March 1841, and in 1842 he read a paper "On the Introduction of Letterpress Printing for numbering and dating the Notes of the Bank of England" (Proceedings, 1842, p. 166), and in the following year he contributed "A Description of the Automatic Balance at the Bank of England invented by W. Cotton" (Proceedings, 1843, p. 121). For the latter he received a Telford medal. He died at Brussels on 7 November 1851.
