= Arbor press =

Small hand-operated machine tool

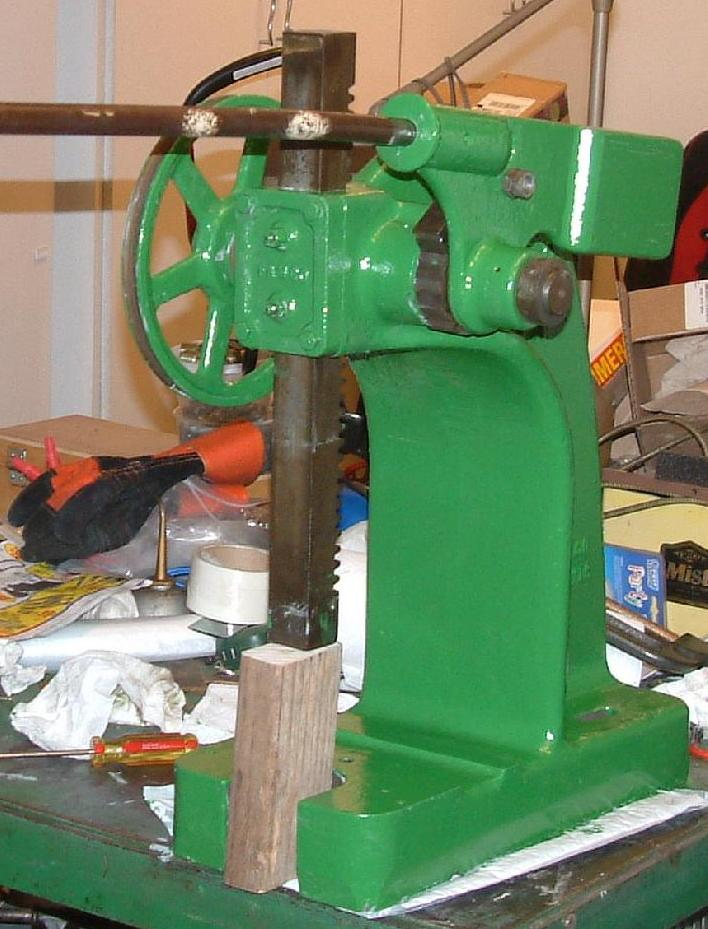
A 4-ton ratcheting arbor press

An arbor press is a small hand-operated press. It is typically used to perform smaller jobs, such as staking, riveting, installing, configuring and removing bearings, and other press fit work. Punches, inserters, or other tools/dies may be added to the end of the ram depending on the desired task. Arbor presses are usually rated by the ideal force that the leverage bar can apply. Typically common are presses with a leverage of one to five tons. This leverage is achieved when a force is applied to the lever arm or wheel.

Arbor presses can be mounted on a work bench, wall, or pedestal. The base is usually constructed of cast metal. A ram provides the force; it may be square or round. The ram is usually driven by a rack and pinion. Higher force arbor presses have a further gear reduction. Forces are usually generated by manual or hydraulic input.
