= Form-fit connection =

Mechanical connection between two parts

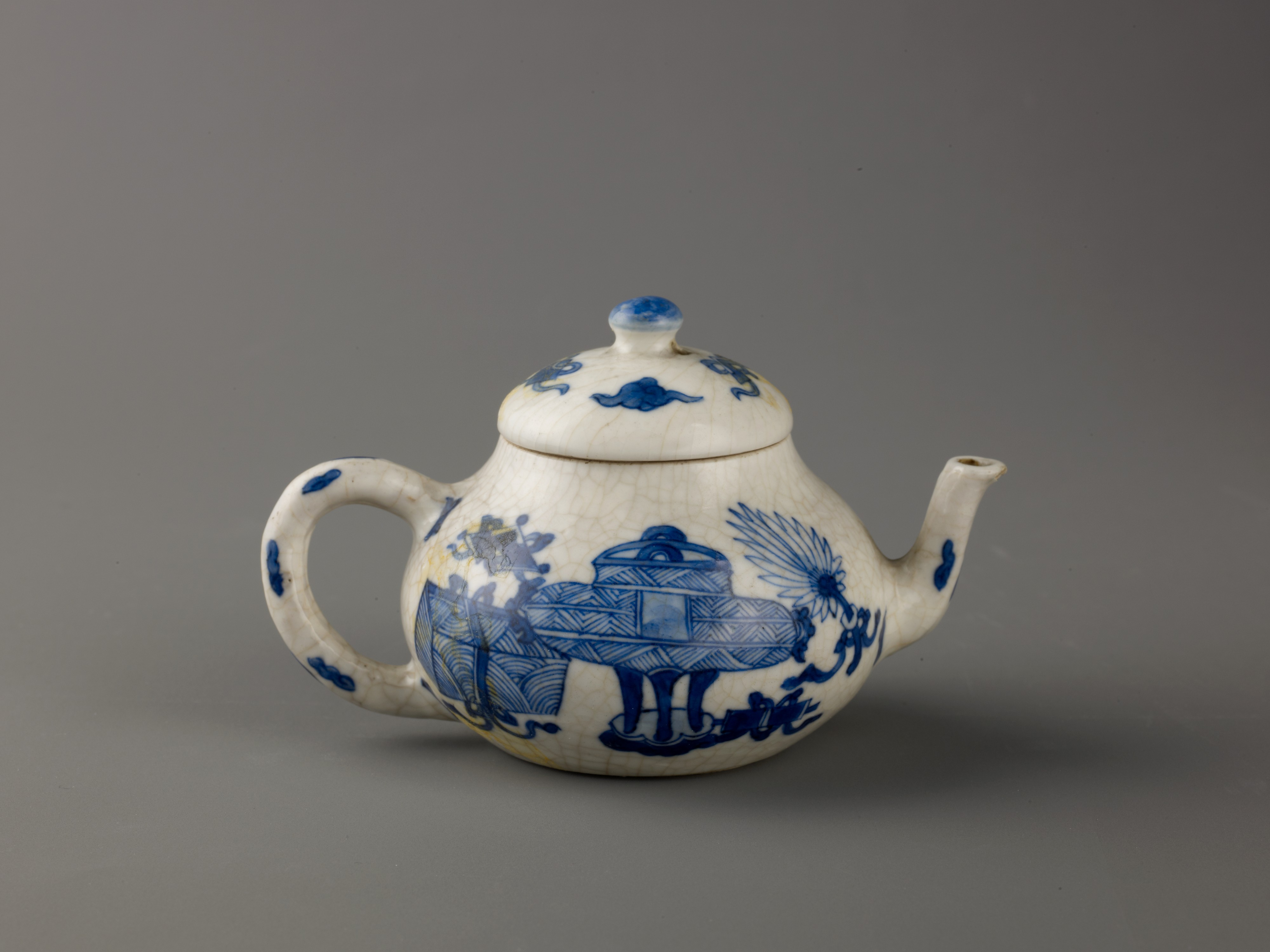
The lid of a teapot creates a form-fit connection along the vertical downward direction and any horizontal linear direction, but not along a rotational direction

A form-fit, form-locking or form-closed connection is a type of mechanical connection between two parts (such as the head of a screw with a screwdriver), wherein these parts, due to their forms, interlock and block each other along at least one defined linear or rotational direction. A form-fit connection acts via the geometric contact of two effective surfaces, and the effective forces are transmitted as normal forces to the effective surfaces of a driver part (surface pressure and Hertzian contact stress). Typically, some manufacturing-related tolerance occurs in the connection during form-fit.

Form-fit connections are created by the interlocking of the connecting components. For example, in regards to a teapot, the lid has an inner lip that prevents it from slipping sideways from the pot, but it can be freely rotated in place since its round shape allows it to do so. As this form-fit connection does not prevent the lid from being lifted up and off of the teapot, it is considered a "half form-fit" connection.

== Description ==
The spring of a clothespin fits snugly into the notches of the two prongs

Unlike an interference fit, which relies on friction, a form fit uses the geometry of the parts themselves to prevent them from separating. Joints can be fixed or articulated, among other types. Form-fit connections can be observed in everyday objects and tools, from primitive times to more advanced applications. Examples include cotter pins, dovetail joints, gears, tongue and groove joints, and zipper teeth.

In solid assemblies, the forces that can act can be diverse. Often, in addition to geometry, other effects (friction, elastic forces, use of adhesives, etc.) must be taken into account for correct operation. For example, Lego connections rely on both form and interference fits to ensure stability. The plastic is sufficiently elastic and provides a small anchoring force.

== Examples ==
=== Dry stone ===
Dry stone constructions, whether natural or worked, base their stability on the relative shape of the stones and their arrangement as a whole. Considering gravity and friction, they constitute a traditional solution and an example of form-fit closure. In 2018, UNESCO inscribed this practice on the Representative List of the Intangible Cultural Heritage of Humanity, under the name Knowledge and techniques of the art of building dry stone walls, affecting the territory of Croatia, Cyprus, France, Greece, Italy, Slovenia, Spain and Switzerland.

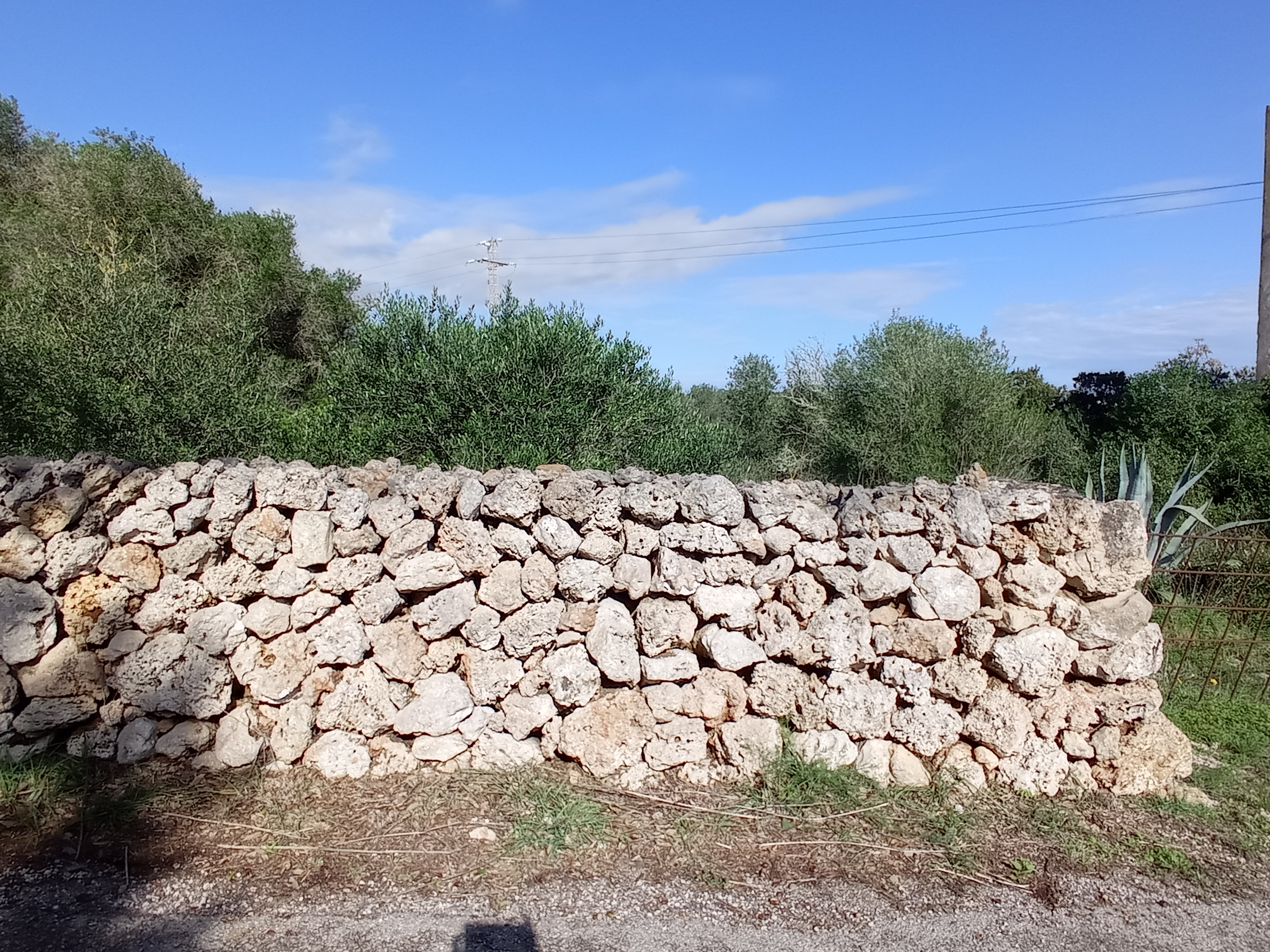

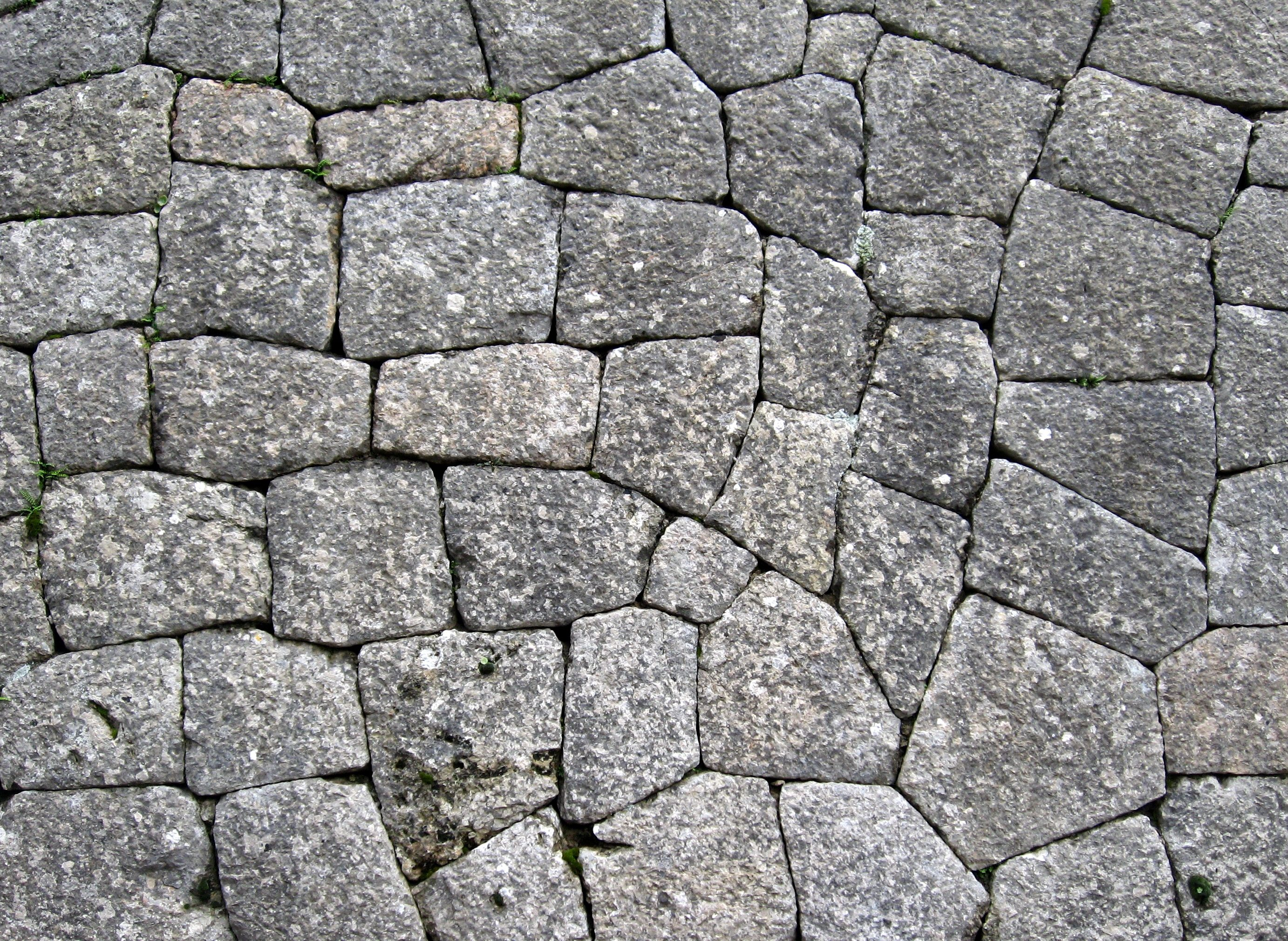

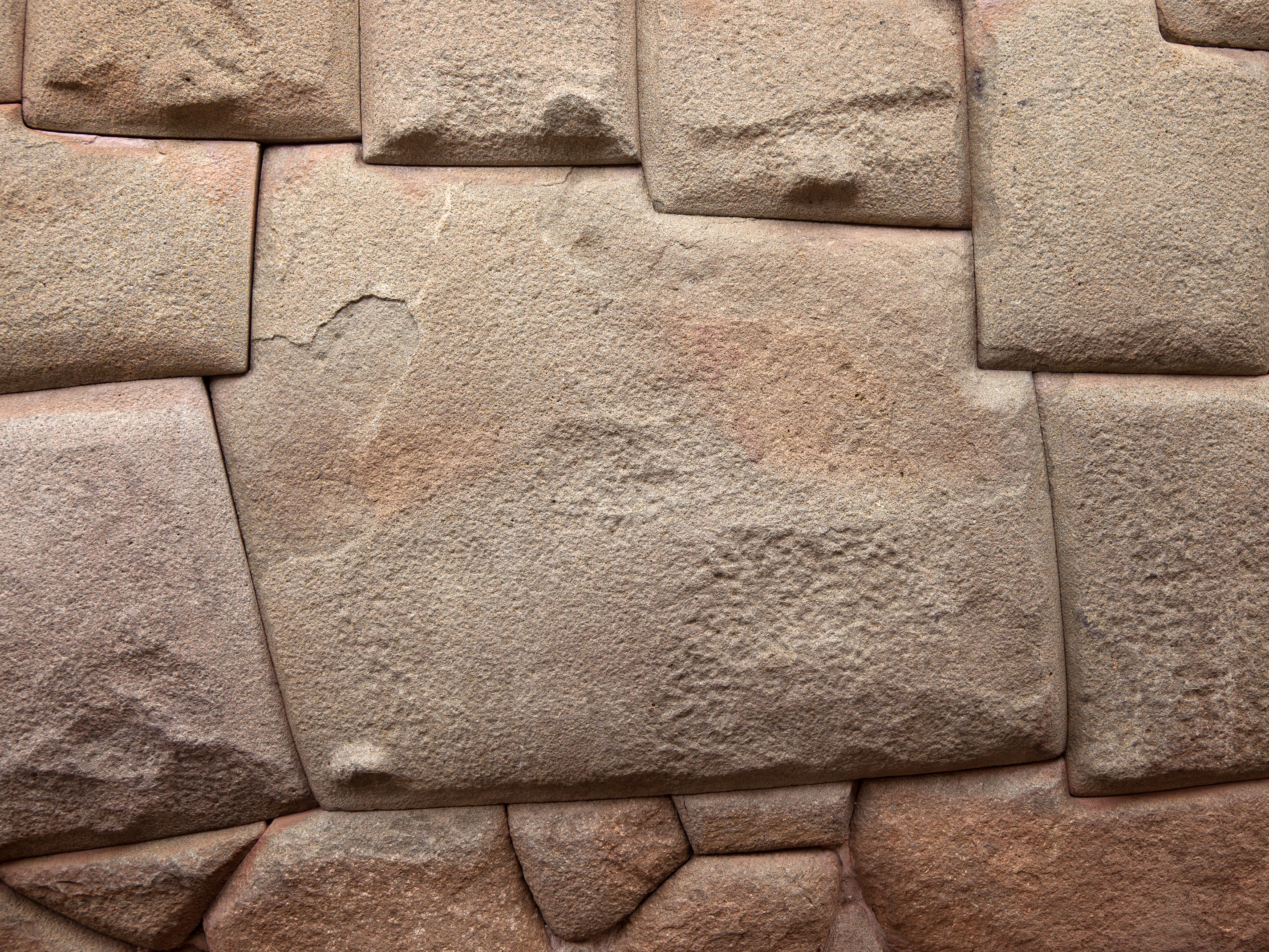

=== Primitive weapons ===
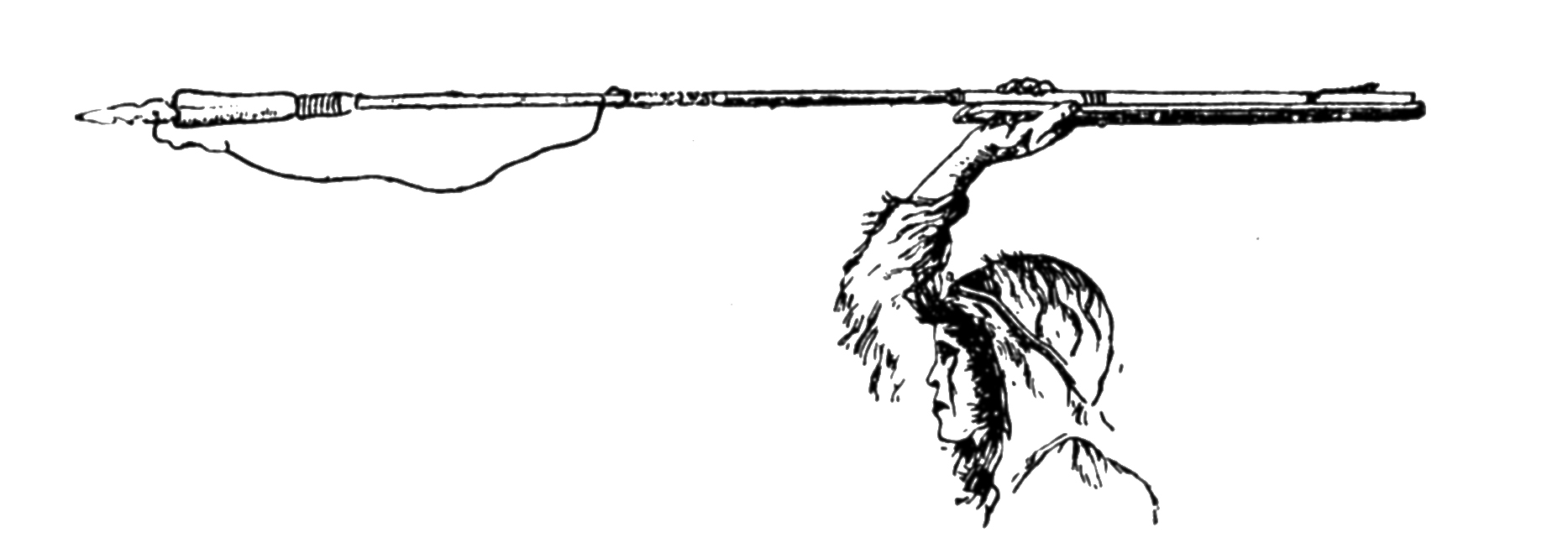
Inuit using a spear-thrower

Spear-throwers have a hook or protuberance for the concave rear end of the spear to rest on, ensuring that it does not slip from the spear-thrower.

=== Violins ===
The sound post of a violin is a small cylindrical piece of wood that is mounted with slight interference between the soundboard and the bottom. It constitutes a fixed form-fit connection without any adhesive, allowing for disassembly.

The tuning pegs on a violin are slightly tapered, fitting into tapered holes in the head of the instrument.

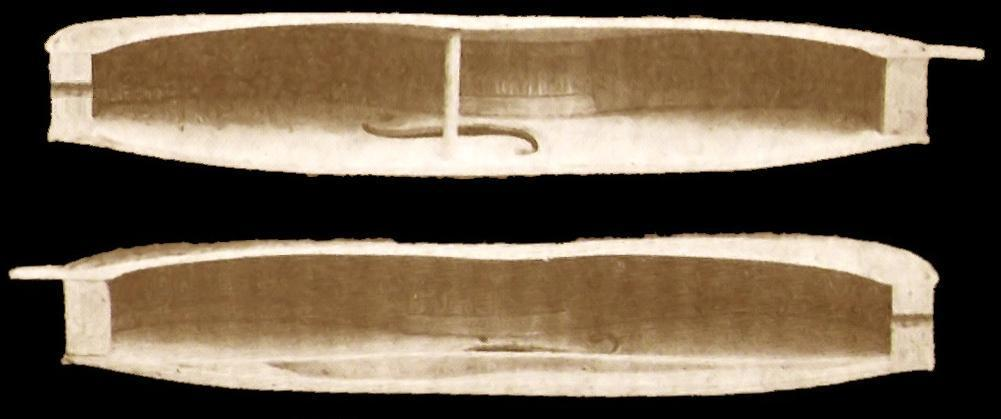
Violin sound post

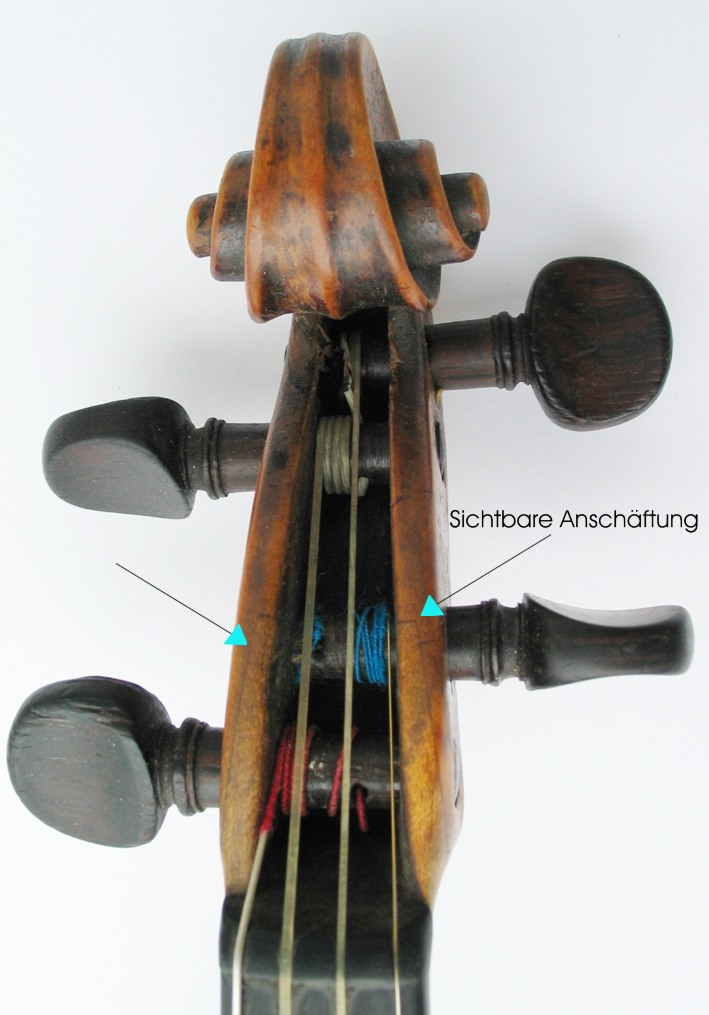
Violin head with tuning pegs

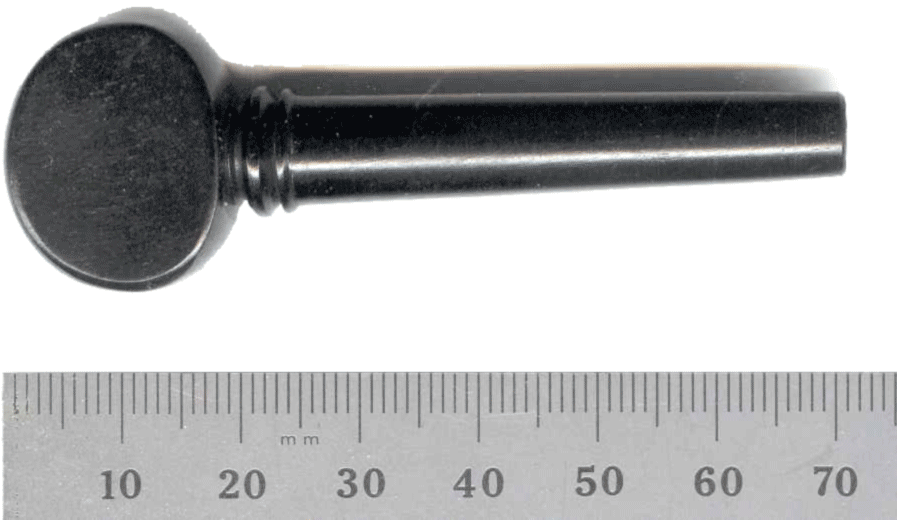
Violin tuning peg

=== Transmatic transmissions ===
In 1987, a continuously variable transmission developed by Van Doorne based on a metal belt (multi-piece) was marketed. It was similar to a Variomatic, but used a metal belt instead of the Variomatic's rubber belt. The multi-piece metal belt consisted of many small steel pieces mounted between two flexible hardened steel belts. Each small piece was guided by a strap on each side, creating a form-fit connection.

=== Puzzles ===
Many mechanical puzzles utilize form-fit connections.

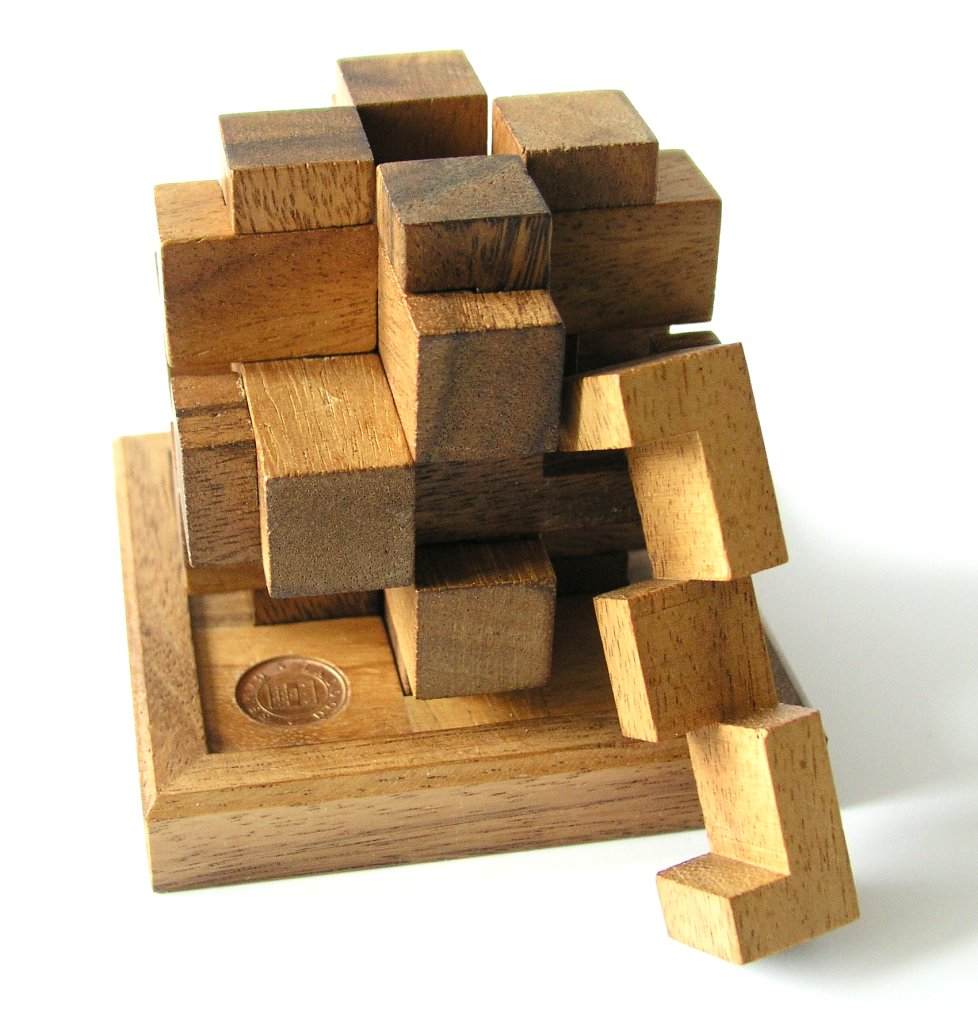

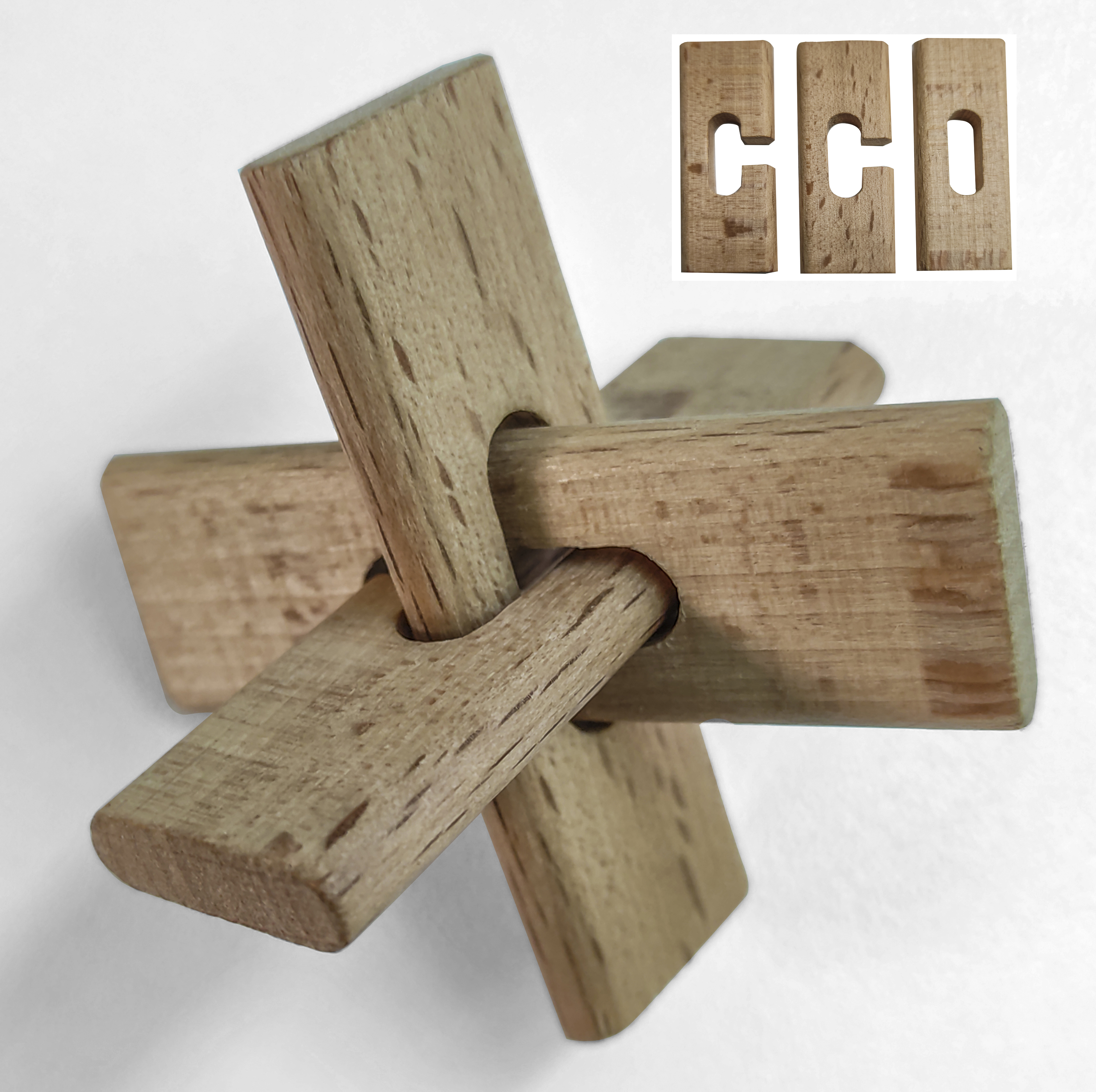
