= Tolerance ring =

Radially sprung shim press fitted between components as a frictional fastener

A tolerance ring is a radially sprung ring that is press fitted between two mating components to act as a frictional fastener. They are flexible shims designed to fix two cylindrical parts together. The wavelike protrusions that run around the circumference of the ring generate a retention force to provide an optimal fit between the two mating components without the need for adhesive or excessive assembly force, simplifying the process for manufacturers. They allow for any misalignment caused by thermal expansion or excessive vibration. Tolerance rings can be used as bearing mounts and as a means of dealing with torque transfer, torque overload protection and axial slip between mating components. They are often used to isolate undesirable vibration in engines and electric motors, for noise-free mechanism operation in passenger vehicles and domestic appliances, where noise reduction has become a major trend in recent years. Modifications to tolerance rings can be made to tune the dynamic stiffness and, therefore, the frequencies that can be isolated.

Tolerance rings can be used to eliminate noise completely, simply by taking up clearance between mating components, which could otherwise lead to rattling in the system as the parts are not completely constrained.

== Automotive use ==
Tolerance rings are used in a number of mechanisms throughout the automotive powertrain and steering systems, as well as the car interior and exterior. Their torque limiting and overload capabilities allow them to be used as simple clutch devices in several applications, such as the automatic tailgate motor and the collapsible steering column. They are also used by automotive manufacturers to mount bearings in hinges and gears in the power train.

Their lightweight properties have also made tolerance rings attractive to automotive manufacturers as they seek to enhance car performance while complying with government requirements for reductions in carbon emissions. In the European Union, regulations on car emissions have been introduced by the European Commission, restricting the amount of carbon dioxide (CO_{2}) emissions that a car can emit. Since 2015, EU law requires that new cars do not emit more than 130 grams per kilometer of carbon dioxide (CO_{2}). If that limit is breached then manufacturers can face fines. From 2021 the new mandatory emission target will be a fleet average of 95 grams per kilometer. China is beginning to introduce legislation to create a National Standard, based on carbon emission reduction regulations already in effect in Europe. The U.S. Environmental Protection Agency (EPA) requires automotive companies to average carbon dioxide (CO_{2}) tailpipe emissions at 101 grams per kilometer (163 grams/mile) by model year 2025. These regulations require car manufacturers to reduce the weight of their engines and vehicles to enhance fuel efficiency. According to the EPA estimations, every 10 per cent drop in car mass decreases fuel use between 5 and 10 per cent.

In most modern electric power steering (EPS) systems, the motor housing is a part of the rack casting which is usually made from lightweight materials, such as aluminum alloys. The stators are traditionally press fitted into the housing. Tolerance rings can be used instead of press fitting. With their wavelike protrusions, tolerance rings generate a retention force when compressed between the housing and the stator. These protrusions act as springs and allow the mating components to expand and contract at different rates while still providing the required retention force. Tolerance rings also make sure that there is a constant thermal bridge between the stator and the housing, allowing heat to be dissipated away from the stator. Cooler operating temperatures result in higher efficiency and an extended life of the motor.

Tolerance rings are used as an electric motor stator mount in electric power steering (EPS) to protect the system from torque overload in the event of back-driven shocks through the steering system. They do this by allowing the drive shaft to slip inside the gear so the gear teeth are not damaged, which strengthens the longevity of the EPS system.

The collapsible steering column has been designed to protect the driver from injuries caused by striking the steering system in a crash. Consisting of two interlocking shafts, the collapsible steering column absorbs energy by collapsing inwards or breaking upon impact. To secure the shaft and housing of the steering column in place during normal driving conditions, a tolerance ring is fitted between the two parts. The tolerance ring is designed to axially slip at a predetermined torque level, enabling the shaft to slide inside its housing in a crash, absorbing impact energy to protect the driver.

According to the European Union Commission Directive 95/56/EC (1995), all vehicles are mandated to be fitted with anti-theft security devices. The regulation requires that a steering lock must be able to withstand forces of 100Nm applied to the steering wheel without failing. It also requires that cars exported to European markets be fitted with security devices. The Chinese national standard GB15740-2006 obliges Chinese car producers to incorporate anti-theft mechanisms in their vehicles. In a steering lock, a tolerance ring's wavelike protrusions maintain a retention force between the steering shaft and lock column. This allows the inner shaft to move freely within the housing when the steering lock is applied, while securing the two parts in place during normal car operation.

In a tailgate motor, the tolerance ring protects the motor and gearing from excessive force, acting as a clutch. If the trunk is subjected to a force opposite to the motion (i.e. when someone is manually opening the trunk when it is automatically closing), the tolerance ring will allow the components to slip against each other, at certain torque levels. This protects the other components in the trunk mechanism.

To ensure the armrest stays in place when it is stowed away by the passenger and does not fall down when the car travels over rough terrain, a tolerance ring is used at the pivot. Its wavelike protrusions generate sufficient torque to hold it in place and to allow for the correct adjustment feel.

Tolerance rings are used in a number of mechanisms in domestic and industrial air conditioning (AC) systems. AC manufacturers use them as stator and bearing mounts.

== Air conditioning ==
Tolerance rings are used to secure the stator within the frame. It acts as a cushion when the AC motor is in operation to absorb vibration for noise-free AC performance.

Tolerance rings are also used in the top frame structure of AC systems to secure the top of the rotor, replacing spot welding. They absorb vibration from the rotor and crankshaft in the AC motor when the compressor is running at high speed, ensuring the AC pump operates as efficiently as possible over its life cycle and reducing noise.

== Computing ==
Tolerance rings are used in hard disk drives (HDD) to mount disks or bearing cartridges into the drives. The waves on their outer surface allow them to absorb excess vibration to reduce torque ripple effect and resonance to improve the HDD’s performance. The tolerance rings also ensure fast and easy assembly by eliminating the need for adhesive.
