= Fit (manufacturing) =

Degree of 'looseness' with which an shaft is inserted into an orifice

In precision mechanics, fit refers to the degree of 'looseness' with which a shaft is inserted into a bored hole.

This coupling is related to the tolerance or allowance of both parts' dimensions. The shaft and the orifice must be of a similar diameter, otherwise there will not be a correct adjustment. With this in mind, measurements have been internationally standardised according to ISO regulation to ensure the interchangeability of items and their mass production.

Tolerance values are designated with a capital letter in the case of orifices and lower case letters in the case of shafts. The lower the value the higher the machining costs, as a greater precision is required.

== Maximum and minimum clearance ==
The maximum clearance of a fit is the difference between the upper bound of the orifice diameter and the lower bound of the shaft diameter.

maximum clearance = maximum orifice diameter – minimum shaft diameter

The minimum clearance meanwhile is the difference between the lower bound of the orifice diameter and the upper bound of the shaft diameter.

minimum clearance = minimum orifice diameter – maximum shaft diameter

The maximum clearance in a loose or sliding fit is always greater than zero; on the other hand, in a tight fit both the maximum and minimum clearance are negative.

== See also ==
- Engineering fit
- Interference fit

== Bibliography ==
- Millán Gómez, Simón (2006). Procedimientos de Mecanizado. Madrid: Editorial Paraninfo. ISBN 84-9732-428-5.
- Sandvik Coromant (2006). Guía Técnica de Mecanizado. AB Sandvik Coromant 2005.10.
- Larburu Arrizabalaga, Nicolás (2004). Máquinas. Prontuario. Técnicas máquinas herramientas. Madrid: Thomson Editores. ISBN 84-283-1968-5.
- Varios autores (1984). Enciclopedia de Ciencia y Técnica. Salvat Editores S.A. ISBN 84-345-4490-3.
- Cruz Teruel, Francisco (2005). Control numérico y programación. Marcombo, Ediciones técnicas.
