= Torque density =

Torque density is a measure of the torque-carrying capability of a mechanical component. It is the ratio of torque capability to volume and is expressed in units of torque per volume.

Torque density is a system property since it depends on the design of each element of the component being examined and their interconnection.

While torque is a Pseudovector, volume only by definition exists in three Euclidean dimensions, must always be positive, and never can be negative.

== Examples and uses ==
Torque density of magnetic gearboxes, wind turbines, magnetic trains, and mechanical trains are used to compare the energy efficiency of machines; 150 kilo-Newton-meters per cubic meter per stage is considered the highest attainable as of 2024.

Torque density is useful during the concept evaluation stage of mechanical designs, especially in power train design problems. Typically, it will be one of many factors used to assign potential success measures to each concept. For example, in the upgrade of a drive train for a set of rolls in a rolling mill, space is often dictated by the configuration of current components. There may be several types of devices that can perform the function of an existing component that must be replaced. The relative torque densities of the devices may be an important determinant for which design is ultimately selected, although it will often compete with other factors such as cost, ease of maintenance, time to install, operating costs and potential failure modes.

== Units ==
In SI units, torque density is expressed in joules per cubic metre or equivalently newton-metres per cubic metre.

Although dimensionally equivalent to the pascal, that is usually not used for this purpose.

Small amounts can be expressed in newton-millimetres per cubic millimetre.

In U.S. customary units, torque density is expressed in foot-pounds force per cubic foot, or inch-pounds force per cubic inch or ounce-force inches per cubic inch.

== See also ==
- Angular momentum
- Automobile design
- Density
- Mechanical engineering
- Newton-meter
- Pressure
- Renewable energy
- Superconductivity
- Sustainability
