= Fitness =

Fitness may refer to:

- Physical fitness, a state of health and well-being of the body
- Fitness culture, a sociocultural phenomenon surrounding exercise and physical fitness
- Fitness (biology), an individual's ability to propagate its genes
- Fitness (cereal), a brand of breakfast cereals and granola bars
- Fitness (magazine), a women's magazine, focusing on health and exercise
- Fitness (Apple), a mobile application developed by Apple
- Fitness and figure competition, a form of physique training, related to bodybuilding
- Fitness approximation, a method of function optimization in evolutionary computation or artificial evolution methodologies
- Fitness function, a particular type of objective function in mathematics and computer science
- "Fitness", a 2018 song by Lizzo

== See also ==
- FitNesse, a web server, a wiki, and a software testing tool
- Survival of the fittest
