= Interference fit =

Fastening between tightly fitting parts

An interference fit, also known as a press fit, force fit, or friction fit, is a form of fastening between two tightfitting mating parts that produces a joint which is held together by friction after the parts are pushed together.

Depending on the amount of interference, parts may be joined using a tap from a hammer or forced together using a hydraulic press. Heating the outer part, or cooling the inner part may be used to shrink the inner part relative to the outer part. This method allows the components to be joined with less or no force and produces a shrink fit interference when the component returns to normal temperature. Interference fits are commonly used with aircraft fasteners to improve the fatigue life of a joint.

These fits, though applicable to shaft and hole assembly, are more often used for bearing-housing or bearing-shaft assembly. This is referred to as a 'press-in' mounting.

== Tightness of fit ==
The tightness of fit is controlled by amount of interference; the allowance (planned difference from nominal size). Formulas exist to compute allowance that will result in various strengths of fit such as loose fit, light interference fit, and interference fit. The value of the allowance depends on which material is being used, how big the parts are, and what degree of tightness is desired. Such values have already been worked out in the past for many standard applications, and they are available to engineers in the form of tables, obviating the need for re-derivation.

As an example, a 10 mm (0.394 in) shaft made of 303 stainless steel will form a tight fit with allowance of 3–10 μm (0.00012–0.00039 in). A slip fit can be formed when the bore diameter is 12–20 μm (0.00047–0.00079 in) wider than the rod; or, if the rod is made 12–20 μm under the given bore diameter. An example:

The allowance per inch of diameter usually ranges from 0.001 to 0.0025 inches (0.0254 to 0.0635 mm) (0.1–0.25%), 0.0015 inches (0.0381 mm) (0.15%) being a fair average. Ordinarily the allowance per inch decreases as the diameter increases; thus the total allowance for a diameter of 2 inches (50.8 mm) might be 0.004 inches (0.1016 mm), 0.2%), whereas for a diameter of 8 inches (203.2 mm) the total allowance might not be over 0.009 or 0.010 inches (0.2286 or 0.2540 mm) i.e., 0.11–0.12%). The parts to be assembled by forced fits are usually made cylindrical, although sometimes they are slightly tapered. Advantages of the taper form are: the possibility of abrasion of the fitted surfaces is reduced; less pressure is required in assembling; and parts are more readily separated when renewal is required. On the other hand, the taper fit is less reliable, because if it loosens, the entire fit is free with but little axial movement. Some lubricant, such as white lead and lard oil mixed to the consistency of paint, should be applied to the pin and bore before assembling, to reduce the tendency toward abrasion.

== Assembling ==
There are two basic methods for assembling an oversize shaft into an undersized hole, sometimes used in combination: force and thermal expansion or contraction.

=== Force ===
There are at least three different terms used to describe an interference fit created via force: press fit, friction fit, and hydraulic dilation.

Press fit is achieved with presses that can press the parts together with very large amounts of force. The presses are generally hydraulic, although small hand-operated presses (such as arbor presses) may operate by means of the mechanical advantage supplied by a jackscrew or by a gear reduction driving a rack and pinion. The amount of force applied in hydraulic presses may be anything from a few pounds for the tiniest parts to hundreds of tons for the largest parts.

The edges of shafts and holes are chamfered (beveled). The chamfer forms a guide for the pressing movement, helping to distribute the force evenly around the circumference of the hole, to allow the compression to occur gradually instead of all at once, thus helping the pressing operation to be smoother, to be more easily controlled, and to require less power (less force at any one instant of time), and to assist in aligning the shaft parallel with the hole it is being pressed into. In the case of train wheelsets the wheels are pressed onto the axles by force.

=== Thermal expansion or contraction ===
Most materials expand when heated and shrink when cooled. Enveloping parts are heated (e.g., with torches or gas ovens) and assembled into position while hot, then allowed to cool and contract back to their former size, except for the compression that results from each interfering with the other. This is also referred to as shrink-fitting. Railroad axles, wheels, and tires are typically assembled in this way. Alternatively, the enveloped part may be cooled before assembly such that it slides easily into its mating part. Upon warming, it expands and interferes. Cooling is often preferable as it is less likely than heating to change material properties, e.g., assembling a hardened gear onto a shaft, where the risk exists of heating the gear too much and drawing its temper.

== See also ==
- Engineering fit – Geometric dimensioning and tolerance in engineering
- Engineering tolerance – Permissible limit or limits of variation
- Form-fit connection – Mechanical connection between two parts
- Spring pin – Mechanical fastener
- Tolerance rings – Radially sprung shim press fitted between components as a frictional fastener
