= Engineering fit =

Geometric dimensioning and tolerance in engineering

Engineering fits are generally used as part of geometric dimensioning and tolerancing when a part or assembly is designed. In engineering terms, the "fit" is the clearance between two mating parts, and the size of this clearance determines whether the parts can, at one end of the spectrum, move or rotate independently from each other or, at the other end, are temporarily or permanently joined. Engineering fits are generally described as a "shaft and hole" pairing, but are not necessarily limited to just round components. ISO is the internationally accepted standard for defining engineering fits, but ANSI is often still used in North America.

ISO and ANSI both group fits into three categories: clearance, location or transition, and interference. Within each category are several codes to define the size limits of the hole or shaft – the combination of which determines the type of fit. A fit is usually selected at the design stage according to whether the mating parts need to be accurately located, free to slide or rotate, separated easily, or resist separation. Cost is also a major factor in selecting a fit, as more accurate fits will be more expensive to produce, and tighter fits will be more expensive to assemble.

Methods of producing work to the required tolerances to achieve a desired fit range from casting, forging and drilling for the widest tolerances through broaching, reaming, milling and turning to lapping and honing at the tightest tolerances.

== ISO system of limits and fits ==
=== Overview ===
The International Organization for Standardization system splits the three main categories into several individual fits based on the allowable limits for hole and shaft size. Each fit is allocated a code, made up of a number and a letter, which is used on engineering drawings in place of upper & lower size limits to reduce clutter in detailed areas.

=== Hole and shaft basis ===
A fit is either specified as shaft-basis or hole-basis, depending on which part has its size controlled to determine the fit. In a hole-basis system, the size of the hole remains constant and the diameter of the shaft is varied to determine the fit; conversely, in a shaft-basis system the size of shaft remains constant and the hole diameter is varied to determine the fit.

The ISO system uses an alpha-numeric code to illustrate the tolerance ranges for the fit, with the upper-case representing the hole tolerance and lower-case representing the shaft. For example, in H7/h6 (a commonly used fit) H7 represents the tolerance range of the hole and h6 represents the tolerance range of the shaft. These codes can be used by machinists or engineers to quickly identify the upper and lower size limits for either the hole or shaft. The potential range of clearance or interference can be found by subtracting the smallest shaft diameter from the largest hole, and largest shaft from the smallest hole.

=== Types of fit ===
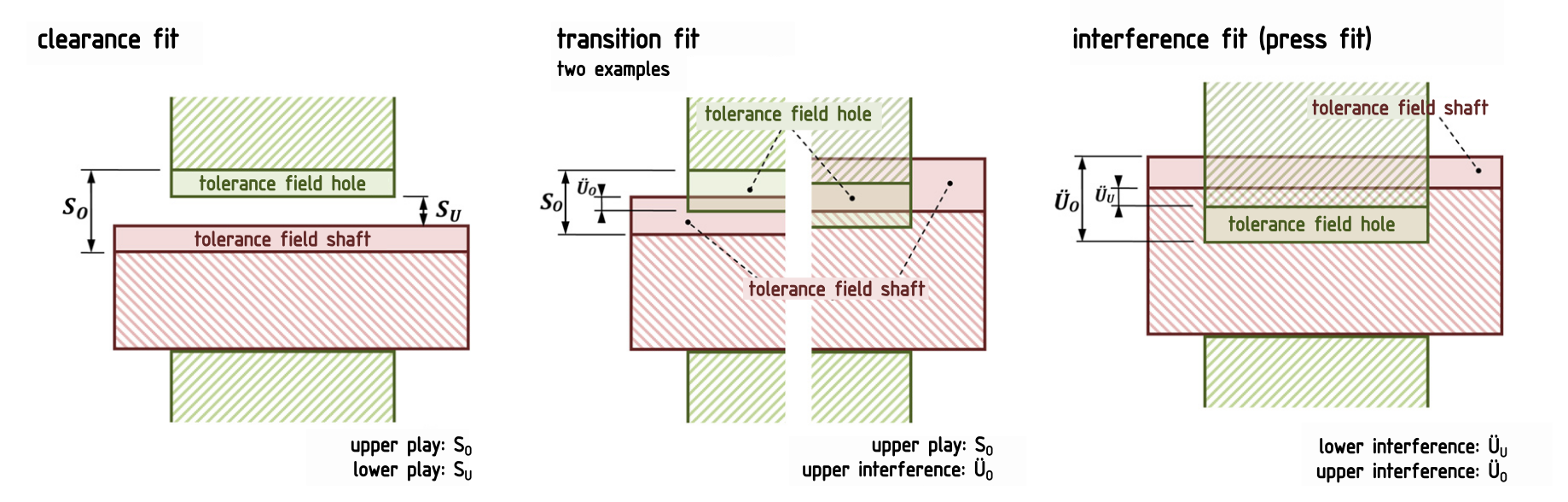
Different types of fits

The three types of fit are:

1. Clearance: The hole is larger than the shaft, enabling the two parts to slide and / or rotate when assembled, e.g. piston and valves
2. Location / transition: The hole is fractionally smaller than the shaft and mild force is required to assemble / disassemble, e.g. Shaft key
3. Interference: The hole is smaller than the shaft and high force and / or heat is required to assemble / disassemble, e.g. Bearing bush

==== Clearance fits ====
Category	Description and Usage	Hole Basis	Shaft Basis
Loose running	Larger clearance where accuracy is not essential, e.g., pivots, latches, parts affected by corrosion, heat, or contamination	H11/c11	C11/h11
Free running	Large clearance where accuracy is not essential and involves high running speeds, large temperature variations, or heavy journal pressures	H9/d9	D9/h9
Close running	Small clearances with moderate requirements for accuracy, e.g., moderate running speeds and journal pressures, shafts, spindles, sliding rods	H8/f7	F8/h7
Sliding	Minimal clearances for high accuracy requirements, which can be easily assembled and will turn & slide freely, e.g., guiding of shafts, sliding gears, crankshaft journals	H7/g6	G7/h6
Location	Very close clearances for precise accuracy requirements, which can be assembled without force and will turn & slide when lubricated, e.g., precise guiding of shafts	H7/h6	H7/h6

For example, using an H8/f7 close-running fit on a 50 mm diameter:

- H8 (hole) tolerance range = +0.000 mm to +0.039 mm
- f7 (shaft) tolerance range = −0.050 mm to −0.025 mm
- Potential clearance will be between +0.025 mm and +0.089 mm

==== Transition fits ====
Category	Description and Usage	Hole Basis	Shaft Basis
Similar fit	Negligible clearance or interference fit which can be assembled or disassembled with a rubber mallet, e.g., hubs, gears, pulleys, bushes, bearings	H7/k6	K7/h6
Fixed fit	Negligible clearance or small interference fit which can be assembled or disassembled with light pressing force, e.g., plugs, driven bushes, armatures on shafts	H7/n6	N7/h6

For example, using an H7/k6 similar fit on a 50 mm diameter:

- H7 (hole) tolerance range = +0.000 mm to +0.025 mm
- k6 (shaft) tolerance range = +0.002 mm to +0.018 mm
- Potential clearance / interference will be between +0.023 mm and −0.018 mm

==== Interference fits ====
Category	Description and Usage	Hole Basis	Shaft Basis
Press fit	Light interference which can be assembled or disassembled with cold pressing, e.g., hubs, bearings, bushings, retainers	H7/p6	P7/h6
Driving fit	Medium interference which can be assembled with hot pressing or cold pressing with large forces, e.g., permanent mounting of gears, shafts, bushes (tightest possible with cast iron)	H7/s6	S7/h6
Forced fit	High interference shrink fit requiring large temperature differential of parts to assemble, permanent coupling of gears and shafts that cannot be disassembled without risking destruction	H7/u6	U7/h6

For example, using an H7/p6 press fit on a 50mm diameter:

- H7 (hole) tolerance range = +0.000 mm to +0.025 mm
- p6 (shaft) tolerance range = +0.042 mm to +0.026 mm
- Potential interference will be between −0.001 mm and −0.042 mm.

==== Useful tolerances ====
Common tolerances for sizes ranging from 0 to 120 mm

Useful Tolerances
Nominal Diameter (mm)
Tolerance		over 0 to 3	over 3 to 6	over 6 to 10	over 10 to 18	over 18 to 24	over 24 to 30	over 30 to 40	over 40 to 50	over 50 to 65	over 65 to 80	over 80 to 100	over 100 to 120
Shafts	c11	−0.060 −0.120	−0.070 −0.145	−0.080 −0.205	−0.095 −0.205	−0.110 −0.240		−0.120 −0.280	−0.130 −0.290	−0.140 −0.330	−0.150 −0.340	−0.170 −0.390	−0.180 −0.400
Shafts	d9	−0.020 −0.045	−0.030 −0.060	−0.040 −0.076	−0.050 −0.093	−0.065 −0.117		−0.080 −0.142		−0.100 −0.174		−0.120 −0.207	
Shafts	f7	−0.006 −0.016	−0.010 −0.022	−0.013 −0.028	−0.016 −0.034	−0.020 −0.041		−0.025 −0.050		−0.030 −0.060		−0.036 −0.071	
Shafts	g6	−0.002 −0.008	−0.004 −0.012	−0.005 −0.014	−0.006 −0.017	−0.007 −0.020		−0.009 −0.025		−0.01 −0.029		−0.012 −0.034	
Shafts	h6	0.000 −0.006	0.000 −0.008	0.000 −0.009	0.000 −0.011	0.000 −0.013		0.000 −0.016		0.000 −0.019		0.000 −0.022	
Shafts	h7	0.000 −0.010	0.000 −0.012	0.000 −0.015	0.000 −0.018	0.000 −0.021		0.000 −0.025		0.000 −0.030		0.000 −0.035	
Shafts	h9	0.000 −0.025	0.000 −0.030	0.000 −0.036	0.000 −0.043	0.000 −0.052		0.000 −0.062		0.000 −0.074		0.000 −0.087	
Shafts	h11	0.000 −0.060	0.000 −0.075	0.000 −0.090	0.000 −0.110	0.000 −0.130		0.000 −0.160		0.000 −0.190		0.000 −0.220	
Shafts	k6	+0.006 0.000	+0.009 +0.001	+0.010 +0.001	+0.012 +0.001	+0.015 +0.002		+0.018 +0.002		+0.021 +0.002		+0.025 +0.003	
Shafts	n6	+0.010 +0.004	+0.016 +0.008	+0.019 +0.010	+0.023 +0.012	+0.028 +0.015		+0.033 +0.017		+0.039 +0.020		+0.045 +0.023	
Shafts	p6	+0.012 +0.006	+0.020 +0.012	+0.024 +0.015	+0.029 +0.018	+0.035 +0.022		+0.042 +0.026		+0.051 +0.032		+0.059 +0.037	
Shafts	s6	+0.020 +0.014	+0.027 +0.019	+0.032 +0.023	+0.039 +0.028	+0.048 +0.035		+0.059 +0.043		+0.072 +0.053	+0.078 +0.059	+0.093 +0.071	+0.101 +0.079
Shafts	u6	+0.024 +0.018	+0.031 +0.023	+0.037 +0.028	+0.044 +0.033	+0.054 +0.041	+0.061 +0.048	+0.076 +0.060	+0.086 +0.070	+0.106 +0.087	+0.121 +0.102	+0.146 +0.124	+0.166 +0.144
Holes	C11	+0.120 +0.060	+0.145 +0.070	+0.170 +0.080	+0.205 +0.095	+0.240 +0.110		+0.280 +0.120	+0.290 +0.130	+0.330 +0.140	+0.340 +0.150	+0.390 +0.170	+0.400 +0.180
Holes	D9	+0.045 +0.020	+0.060 +0.030	+0.076 +0.040	+0.093 +0.050	+0.117 +0.065		+0.142 +0.080		+0.174 +0.100		+0.207 +0.120	
Holes	F8	+0.020 +0.006	+0.028 +0.010	+0.035 +0.013	+0.043 +0.016	+0.053 +0.020		+0.064 +0.025		+0.076 +0.030		+0.090 +0.036	
Holes	G7	+0.012 +0.002	+0.016 +0.004	+0.020 +0.005	+0.024 +0.006	+0.028 +0.007		+0.034 +0.009		+0.040 +0.010		+0.047 +0.012	
Holes	H7	+0.010 0.000	+0.012 0.000	+0.015 0.000	+0.018 0.000	+0.021 0.000		+0.025 0.000		+0.030 0.000		+0.035 0.000	
Holes	H8	+0.014 +0.000	+0.018 +0.000	+0.022 +0.000	+0.027 +0.000	+0.033 +0.000		+0.039 +0.000		+0.046 +0.000		+0.054 +0.000	
Holes	H9	+0.025 +0.000	+0.030 +0.000	+0.036 +0.000	+0.043 +0.000	+0.052 +0.000		+0.062 +0.000		+0.074 +0.000		+0.087 +0.000	
Holes	H11	+0.060 0.000	+0.075 0.000	+0.090 0.000	+0.110 0.000	+0.130 0.000		+0.160 0.000		+0.190 0.000		+0.220 0.000	
Holes	K7	0.000 −0.010	+0.003 −0.009	+0.005 −0.010	+0.006 −0.012	+0.006 −0.015		+0.007 −0.018		+0.009 −0.021		+0.010 −0.025	
Holes	N7	−0.004 −0.014	−0.004 −0.016	−0.004 −0.019	−0.005 −0.023	−0.007 −0.028		−0.008 −0.033		−0.009 −0.039		−0.010 −0.045	
Holes	P7	−0.006 −0.016	−0.008 −0.020	−0.009 −0.024	−0.011 −0.029	−0.014 −0.035		−0.017 −0.042		−0.021 −0.051		−0.024 −0.059	
Holes	S7	−0.014 −0.024	−0.015 −0.027	−0.017 −0.032	−0.021 −0.039	−0.027 −0.048		−0.034 −0.059		−0.042 −0.072	−0.048 −0.078	−0.058 −0.093	−0.066 −0.101
Holes	U7	−0.018 −0.028	−0.019 −0.031	−0.022 −0.037	−0.026 −0.044	−0.033 −0.054	−0.040 −0.061	−0.051 −0.076	−0.061 −0.086	−0.076 −0.106	−0.091 -0.121	−0.111 −0.146	−0.131 −0.166

== ANSI fit classes (US only) ==
=== Interference fits ===
Interference fits, also known as press fits or friction fits, are fastenings between two parts in which the inner component is larger than the outer component. Achieving an interference fit requires applying force during assembly. After the parts are joined, the mating surfaces will feel pressure due to friction, and deformation of the completed assembly will be observed.

==== Force fits ====
Force fits are designed to maintain a controlled pressure between mating parts, and are used where forces or torques are being transmitted through the joining point. Like interference fits, force fits are achieved by applying a force during component assembly.

FN 1 to FN 5

==== Shrink fits ====
Shrink fits serve the same purpose as force fits, but are achieved by heating one member to expand it while the other remains cool. The parts can then be easily put together with little applied force, but after cooling and contraction, the same dimensional interference exists as for a force fit. Like force fits, shrink fits range from FN 1 to FN 5.

=== Location fits ===
Location fits are for parts that do not normally move relative to each other.

==== Location interference fit ====
LN 1 to LN 3 (or LT 7 to LT 21?)

==== Location transition fit ====
LT 1 to LT 6 Location fit is for have comparatively better fit than slide fit.

==== Location clearance fit ====
LC 1 to LC 11

=== RC fits ===
The smaller RC numbers have smaller clearances for tighter fits, the larger numbers have larger clearances for looser fits.

==== RC1: close sliding fits ====
Fits of this kind are intended for the accurate location of parts which must assemble without noticeable play.

==== RC2: sliding fits ====
Fits of this kind are intended for the accurate location but with greater maximum clearance than class RC1. Parts made to this fit turn and move easily. This type is not designed for free run. Sliding fits in larger sizes may seize with small temperature changes due to little allowance for thermal expansion or contraction.

==== RC3: precision running fits ====
Fits of this kind are about the closest fits which can be expected to run freely. Precision fits are intended for precision work at low speed, low bearing pressures, and light journal pressures. RC3 is not suitable where noticeable temperature differences occur.

==== RC4: close running fits ====
Fits of this kind are mostly for running fits on accurate machinery with moderate surface speed, bearing pressures, and journal pressures where accurate location and minimum play are desired. Fits of this kind also can be described as smaller clearances with higher requirements for precision fit.

==== RC5 and R6: medium running fits ====
Fits of this kind are designed for machines running at higher running speeds, considerable bearing pressures, and heavy journal pressure. Fits of this kind also can be described with greater clearances with common requirements for fit precision.

==== RC7: Free running fits ====
Fits of this kind are intended for use where accuracy is not essential. It is suitable for great temperature variations. This fit is suitable to use without any special requirements for precise guiding of shafts into certain holes.

==== RC8 and RC9: loose running fits ====
Fits of this kind are intended for use where wide commercial tolerances may be required on the shaft. With these fits, the parts with great clearances with having great tolerances. Loose running fits may be exposed to effects of corrosion, contamination by dust, and thermal or mechanical deformations.

== See also ==
- Coiled spring pins
- Engineering tolerance
- Geometric dimensioning and tolerancing
- Interchangeable parts
- Statistical interference
