= Fischerwerke =

German manufacturer

fischer Group of Companies
- Type: Kommanditgesellschaft
- Industry: Fixings, Automotive, Toys, Consulting
- Founded: 1948
- Founder: Artur Fischer
- Headquarters: Waldachtal, Baden-Württemberg, Germany
- Revenue: ▲€864m (2018)
- Number of employees: ~5200 (worldwide)
- Website: www.fischer.de

Fischerwerke GmbH & Co. KG is a family-owned German multinational manufacturer, best known for its fastening products for the construction and DIY industry. The company also has divisions in the Automotive, Toy, and Consulting industries. Fischer is considered to be a typical example of a large-sized mittelstand company. The name of the firm is not written with a capital 'f', which is an oddity especially in a German context where all nouns are generally written with an initial capital.

The company was founded in 1948 by Artur Fischer and enjoyed early success due to high demand for the original S-Plug, which is still in production today. Ownership now belongs to his son, Klaus Fischer (article in German).

== Overview and operations ==
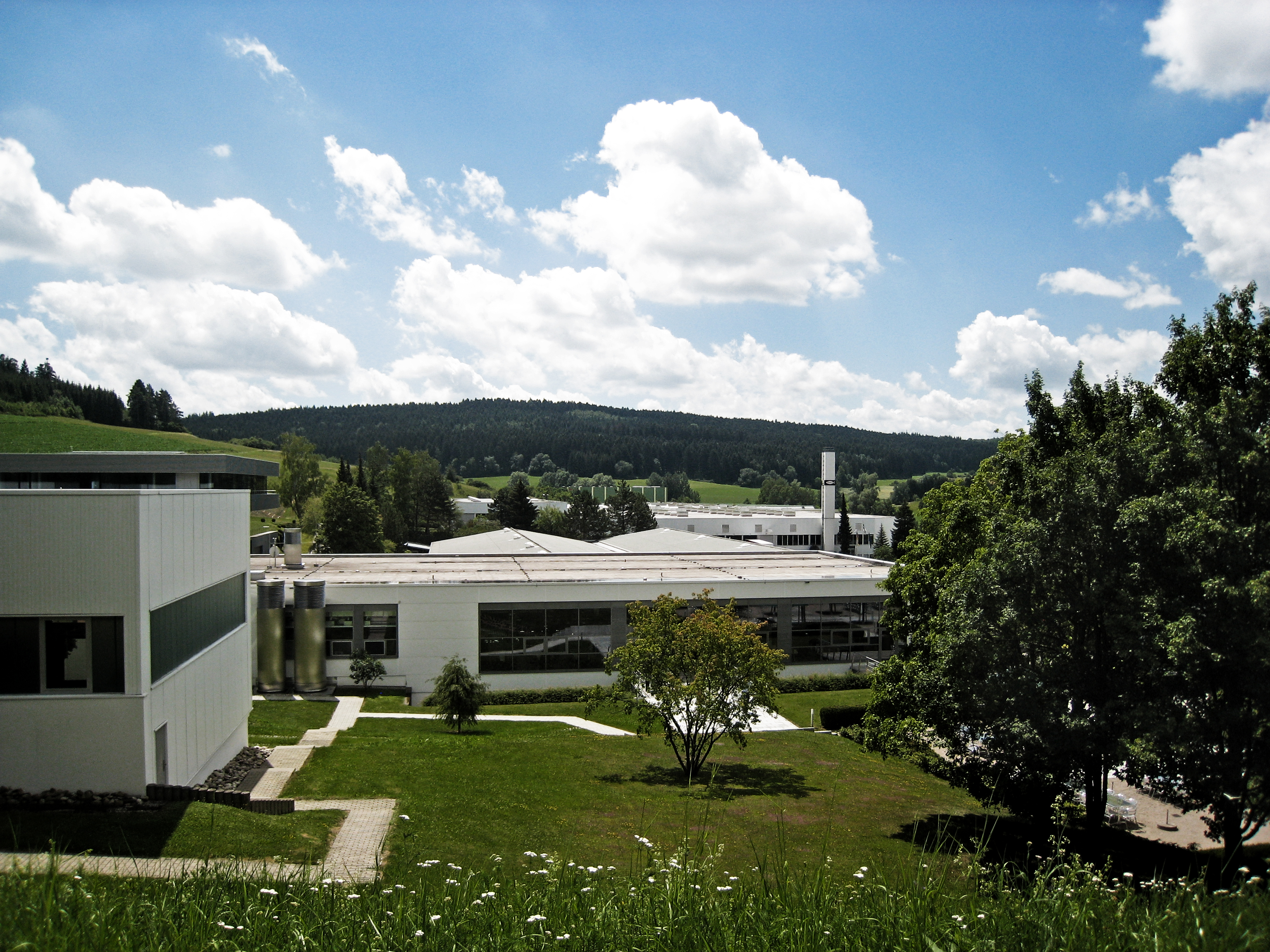
Group headquarters in Waldachtal, Germany

fischer operates 53 subsidiaries in 35 countries worldwide. fischer products are available in countries without a direct subsidiary through a network of importers.

The company manufactures mostly in Germany (multiple locations), but it also operates manufacturing plants in Brazil, Argentina, China, Italy, America, Czechia and Serbia.

The company holds 2,043 patents and registered 13.83 patent applications per 1,000 employees in 2010 (national average: 0.55) which is amongst the highest in Germany.

The majority of the company's turnover comes from the fixings industry. Over 15.5m fischer plugs and anchors are sold worldwide every day.

== History ==
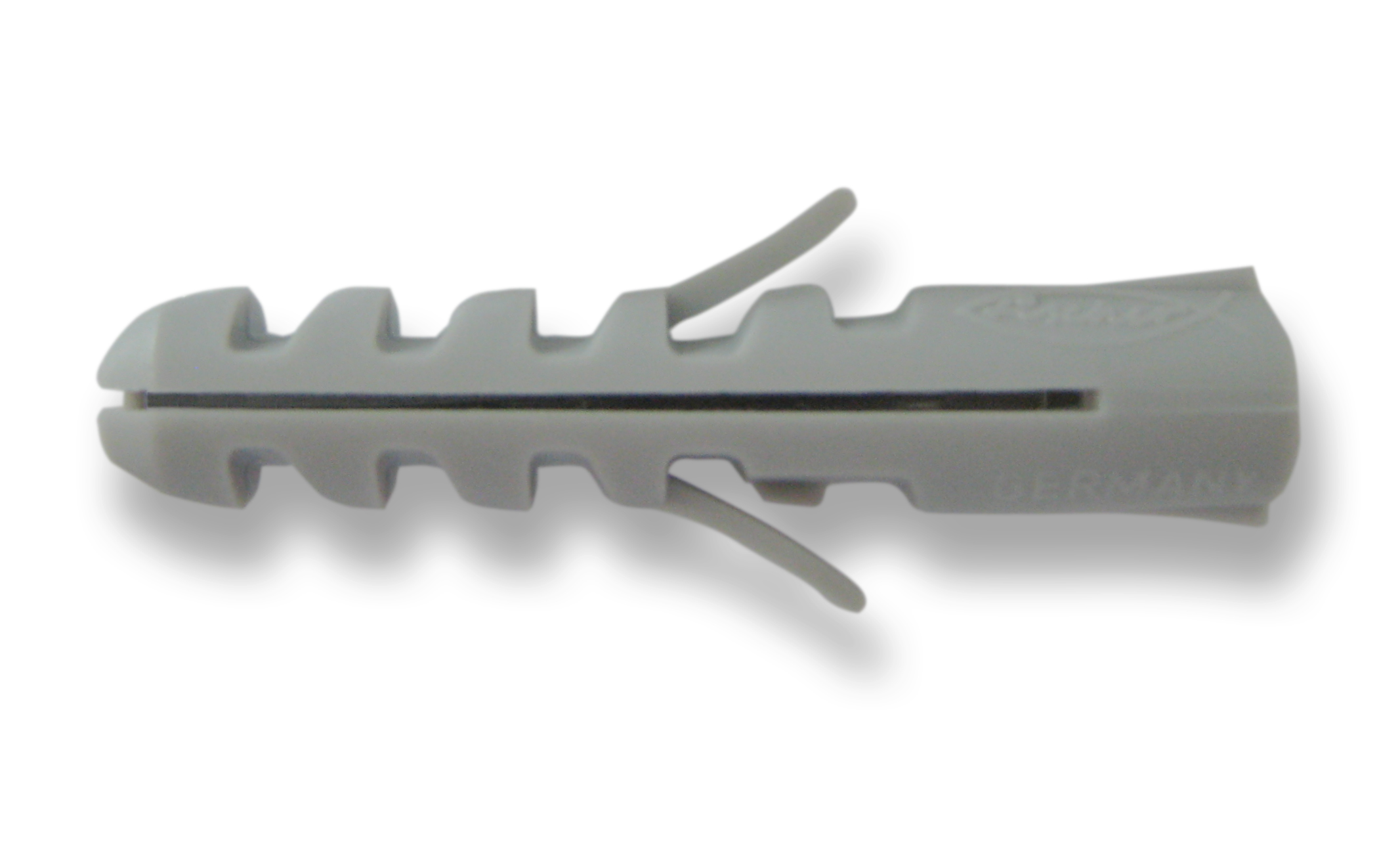
The fischer S-plug

One of the first commercial inventions of Artur Fischer was the synchronous camera flash which was sold to Agfa. In 1958 Artur Fischer designed the first plastic S-Plug which enables screws to be fastened into masonry substrate. Strong demand meant the company expanded rapidly and within three years the first subsidiaries were founded in Brazil and France. Originally intended as a novelty Christmas gift, fischertechnik was launched commercially in 1965.

In 1980 Klaus Fischer took over management of the company from his father and expanded the company seven-fold with moves such as the 1981 launch of the CBOX in-car cassette holder (later becoming the separate division fischer automotive), and the 1993 acquisition of Upat which expanded the range of chemical and steel anchors.

More recently Joerg Fischer has taken the roles of CEO and Chairman thus passing management of the company to the third generation of the family. At his own request, Joerg Fischer left the company in 2012. In 2018, Marc-Sven Mengis became CEO of fischer.

== Divisions ==
=== fischer fixing systems ===
The largest by turnover, this division manufactures a range of anchors used in the construction and DIY industry including nylon plugs, steel anchors, chemical anchors and a range of associated products such as SaMontec, solar-fix and screws.

Notable projects
fischer products have been found in various large construction projects globally including the Channel Tunnel, The Burj Khalifa and the Gotthard Base Tunnel.

=== fischer automotive systems ===
The second largest by turnover, this division manufactures interior automotive fittings, such as cupholders, dashboard compartments, air vents etc. for a large range of OEMs including BMW, Mercedes, Chrysler and Honda

=== fischertechnik ===
A brand of educational construction toy similar to Lego or Meccano involving mechanics and robotics.

=== fischer consulting ===
A small division for internal and external consulting operations, mainly on lean manufacturing processes.

== Sponsorship ==
fischer sponsorship has appeared at a number of different sporting events including VfB Stuttgart matches and the Mercedes AMG team in the DTM racing series.

== Social activities ==
fischer supports a number of projects aimed at education including the Wissenfabrik organisation which fischer helped create in 2005. This project aims to educate schoolchildren from kindergarten onwards in entrepreneurship and business.

An event known as "fischer-forum" is regularly held in the Waldachtal headquarters interviewing notable figures such as (then) Porsche chief Wendelin Wiedeking, BASF CEO Jürgen Hambrecht and Bundespräsident Horst Köhler.
