= NORBIT =

Early form of digital logic developed by Philips

In electronics, the NORBIT family of modules is a very early form (since 1960) of digital logic developed by Philips (and also provided through Valvo and Mullard) that uses modules containing discrete components to build logic function blocks in resistor–transistor logic (RTL) or diode–transistor logic (DTL) technology.

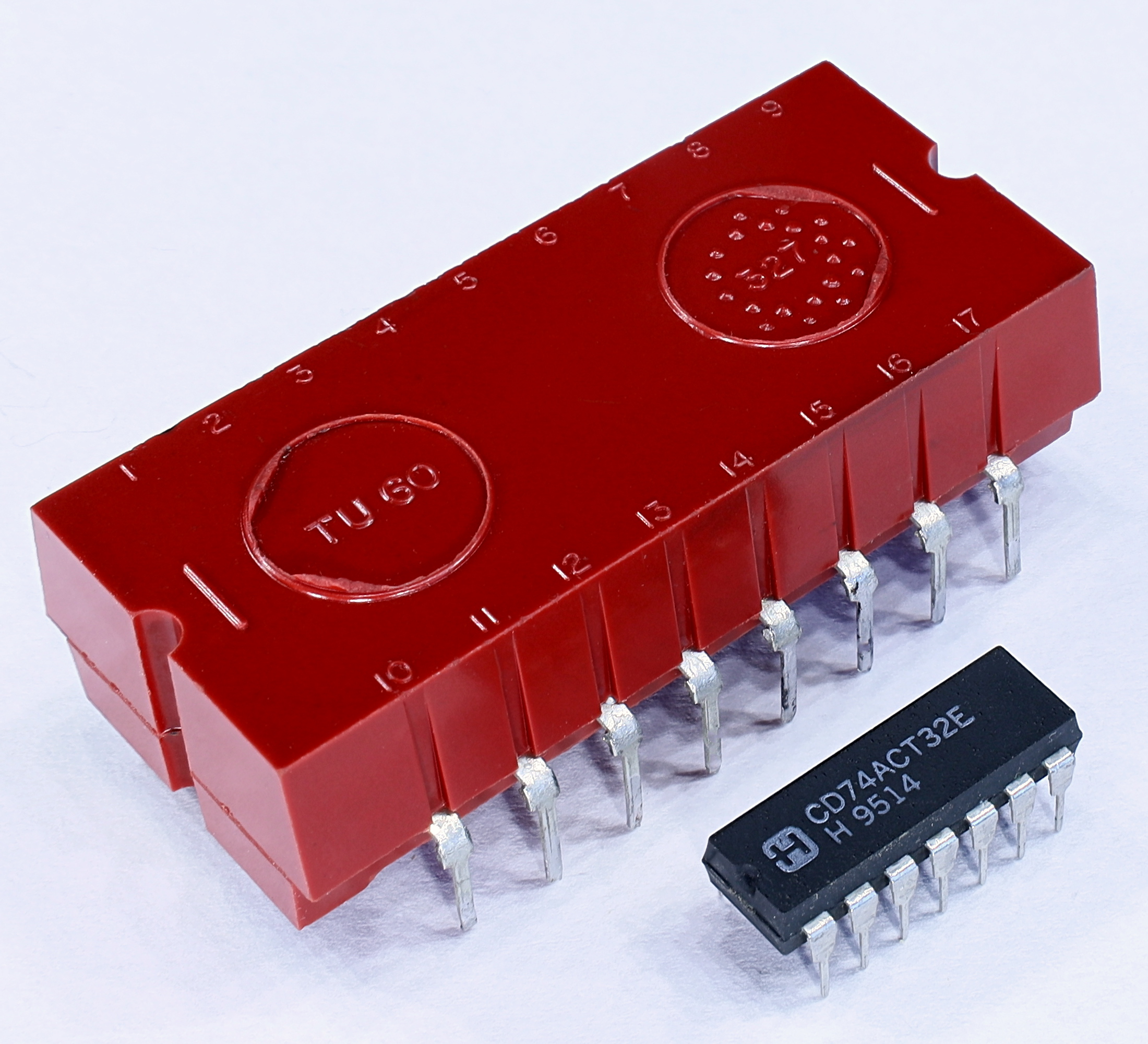
The TU60 (timer circuit) part of 60-series NORBIT 2 family vs CMOS integrated circuit

== Overview ==
The system was originally conceived as building blocks for solid-state hard-wired programmed logic controllers (the predecessors of programmable logic controllers (PLC)) to replace electro-mechanical relay logic in industrial control systems for process control and automation applications, similar to early Telefunken/AEG Logistat, Siemens Simatic, Brown, Boveri & C^{ie}, ACEC Logacec or Akkord Estacord systems.

Each available logical function was recognizable by the color of its plastic container, black, blue, red, green, violet, etc. The most important circuit block contained a NOR gate (hence the name), but there were also blocks containing drivers, and a timer circuit similar to the later 555 timer IC.

The original Norbit modules of the YL 6000 series introduced in 1960 had potted single in-line packages with up to ten long flying leads arranged in two groups of up to five leads in a row. These modules were specified for frequencies of less than 1 kHz at ±24 V supply.

Also available in 1960 were so called Combi-Element (Note: Mullard called these modules Combi-Element in the UK, whereas Philips and Valvo just called them circuit blocks, but distinguished them from the original Norbit series.) modules in single-in line packages with ten evenly spaced stiff leads in a row (5.08 mm / 0.2-inch pitch) for mounting on a PCB. They were grouped in the 1-series (aka "100 kHz series") (Note: Some later datasheets distinguished between the 100 kHz series and the 1-series.) with ±6 V supply. The newer 10-series and 20-series had similarly sized packages, but came with an additional parallel row of nine staggered leads for a total of 19 leads. The 10-series uses germanium alloy transistors, whereas in the 20-series silicon planar transistors are used for a higher cut-off frequency of up to 1 MHz (vs. 30 kHz) and a higher allowed temperature range of +85 °C (vs. +55 °C).

In 1967, the Philips/Mullard NORBIT 2 aka Valvo NORBIT-S (Note: So far, the assumed equivalence of Valvo's Norbit-S series with the Philips Norbit 2 series is based on their release date in 1967. Often, the modules of the newer families were still referred to as Norbits only.) family of modules was introduced, first consisting of the 60-series for frequencies up to 10 kHz at a single supply voltage of 24 V, only. Later, the 61-series, containing thyristor trigger and control modules, was added. A 90-series (Note: The modules of the 90-series were grouped into the 60-series in early datasheets.) became available in the mid-1970s as well. There were three basic types contained in a large (one by two inch-sized) 17 pins dual in-line package, with nine pins spaced 5.08 mm (0.2-inch) on one side and eight staggered pins on the other side.

== Modules ==
=== Original Norbit family ===
YL 6000 series

- YL6000 - NOR gate (red) ("NOR")
- YL6001 - Emitter follower (yellow) ("EF")
- YL6004 - High power output (Double-sized module) ("HP")
- YL6005, YL6005/00 - Counter unit (triple binary) ("3C") (violet)
- YL6005/05 - Single divide by 2 counter (violet) ("1C")
- YL6006 - Timer (brown) ("TU")
- YL6007 - Chassis ("CU")
- YL6008 - Medium power output (orange) ("MP")
- YL6009 - Low power output (white) ("LP")
- YL6010 - Photo-electric detector head ("PD")
- YL6011 - Photo-electric lamp head ("PL")
- YL6012 - Twin 2-input NOR gate (black) ("2.2 NOR")

YL 6100 series

- YL6101 - Rectifier unit, 3…39V 1A
- YL6102 - Rectifier unit, 3…39V 5A
- YL6103/00 - Regulator unit, 6…30V 250mA
- YL6103/01 - Regulator unit, 1…6V 250mA
- YL6104 - Longitudinal link for regulator unit
- YL6105 - Regulator unit, 6V 150mA

88930 Relay series

Used to control relays using variable-length pulse sequences (as with telephone pulse dialing).

- 88930/30 - Input/Output unit
  Filters an input pulse string and can drive two command circuits and two relay units
  Contains 1×/48, 2×/51, and 2×/57.
- 88930/33 - Primary pulse counting unit (dual command)
  Can trigger two different signals via two different pulse sequences. The number of pulses that will trigger each command is configurable.
- 88930/36 - Dual command unit
  Adds two additional commands to the /33.
- 88930/37 - Quad command unit
  Adds four additional commands to the /33.
- 88930/39 - Output unit
  Can drive two command circuits (in /36 or /37 command units) plus two /60 relay units.
  Contains 2×/51 and 2×/57.
- 88930/42 - Empty unit
  For adding custom circuitry. Comprises an empty housing, connector, and blank circuit board.
- 88930/48 - Pulse shaper unit for /33 (no housing)
- 88930/51 - Command preparation unit (no housing)
  For providing input to command units.
- 88930/54 - Reset unit
- 88930/57 - Relay amplifier unit (no housing)
  For driving a low-impedance relay such as the /60 relay block unit.
- 88930/60 - Relay block unit
  Double-pole, double throw 250V 2A relay. Accepts a /57 relay amplifier unit.
- 88930/64 - Power supply unit
  Provides 280V 45mA, 150V 2mA, 24V 750mA, and 15V 120mA.

=== Combi-Element family ===
1-series / B890000 series

- B893000, B164903 - Twin 3-input AND gates (orange) ("2.3A1", "2x3N1")
- B893001, B164904 - Twin 2-input AND gates (orange) ("2.2A1", "2x2N1")
- B893002, 2P72729 - Twin 3-input OR gates (orange) ("2.3O1", "23O1", "2x3P1")
- B893003, 2P72730 - Twin 2-input OR gates (orange) ("2.2O1", "22O1", "2x2P1")
- B894002, B164910 - Twin inverter amplifier (yellow) ("2IA1", "2.IA1", "2xIA1")
- B894005, 2P72728 - Twin inverter amplifier (yellow) ("2IA2", "2xIA2")
- B894001, B164909 - Twin emitter follower (yellow) ("2EF1", 2xEF1")
- B894003, 2P72727 - Twin emitter follower (yellow) ("2EF2", "2xEF2")
- B894000, B164907 - Emitter follower/inverter amplifier (yellow) ("EF1/IA1")
- B895000, B164901 - Pulse shaper (Schmitt trigger + amplifier) (green) ("PS1")
- B895001, B164908 - One-shot multivibrator ("OS1")
- B895003 - One-shot multivibrator ("OS2")
- B892000, B164902 - Flip-flop (red) ("FF1")
- B892001, 2P72707 - Shift-register Flip-flop (red) ("FF2")
- B892002 - Flip-flop (red) ("FF3")
- B892003 - Flip-flop (red) ("FF4")
- B893004, 2P72726 - Pulse logic (orange) ("PL1", "2xPL1")
- B893007 - Pulse logic (orange) ("2xPL2")
- B885000, B164911 - Decade counter ("DC1")
- B890000 - Power amplifier ("PA1")
- B896000 - Twin selector switch for core memories ("2SS1")
- B893005 - Selection gate for core memories ("SG1")
- 2P72732 - Pulse generator for core memories ("PG1")
- 2P72731 - Read amplifier for core memories ("RA1")

10-series

- 2P73701 - Flip-flop ("FF10")
- 2P73702 - Flip-flop ("FF11")
- 2P73703 - Flip-flop / Bistable multivibrator with built-in trigger gates and set-reset inputs (black) ("FF12")
- Dual trigger gate ("2.TG13")
- Dual trigger gate ("2.TG14")
- Quadruple trigger gate ("4.TG15")
- Dual positive gate inverter amplifier ("2.GI10")
- Dual positive gate inverter amplifier ("2.GI11")
- Dual positive gate inverter amplifier ("2.GI12")
- Gate amplifier ("GA11")
- One-shot multivibrator ("OS11")
- Timer unit ("TU10")
- Pulse driver ("PD11")
- Relay driver ("RD10")
- Relay driver ("RD11")
- Power amplifier ("PA10")
- Pulse shaper ("PS10")
- Numerical indicator tube driver ("ID10")

20-series

- 2P73710 - ("2.GI12", "2GI12")

=== Norbit 2 / Norbit-S family ===
60-series

- 2NOR60, 2.NOR60 - Twin NOR (black)
- 4NOR60, 4.NOR60 - Quadruple NOR (black)
- 2.IA60, 2IA60 - Twin inverter amplifier for low power output (blue)
- LPA60 - Twin low power output
- 2.LPA60, 2LPA60 - Twin low power output (blue)
- PA60 - Medium power output (blue)
- HPA60 - High power output (black)
- 2.SF60, 2SF60 - Twin input switch filter (green)
- TU60 - Timer (red)
- FF60 - Flip-flop
- GLD60 - Grounded load driver (black)

61-series

- TT61 - Trigger transformer
- UPA61 - Universal power amplifier
- RSA61 - Rectifier and synchroniser
- DOA61 - Differential operational amplifier
- 2NOR61, 2.NOR61 - Twin NOR

90-series

- PS90 - Pulse shaper (green)
- FF90 - Flip-flop (red)
- 2TG90, 2.TG90 - Twin trigger gate (red)

Accessories

- PSU61 - Power supply
- PCB60 - Printed wiring board
- MC60 - Mounting chassis
- UMC60 - Universal mounting chassis
- MB60 - Mounting bar

== Photo gallery ==
Examples of the 60-series NORBIT 2 family

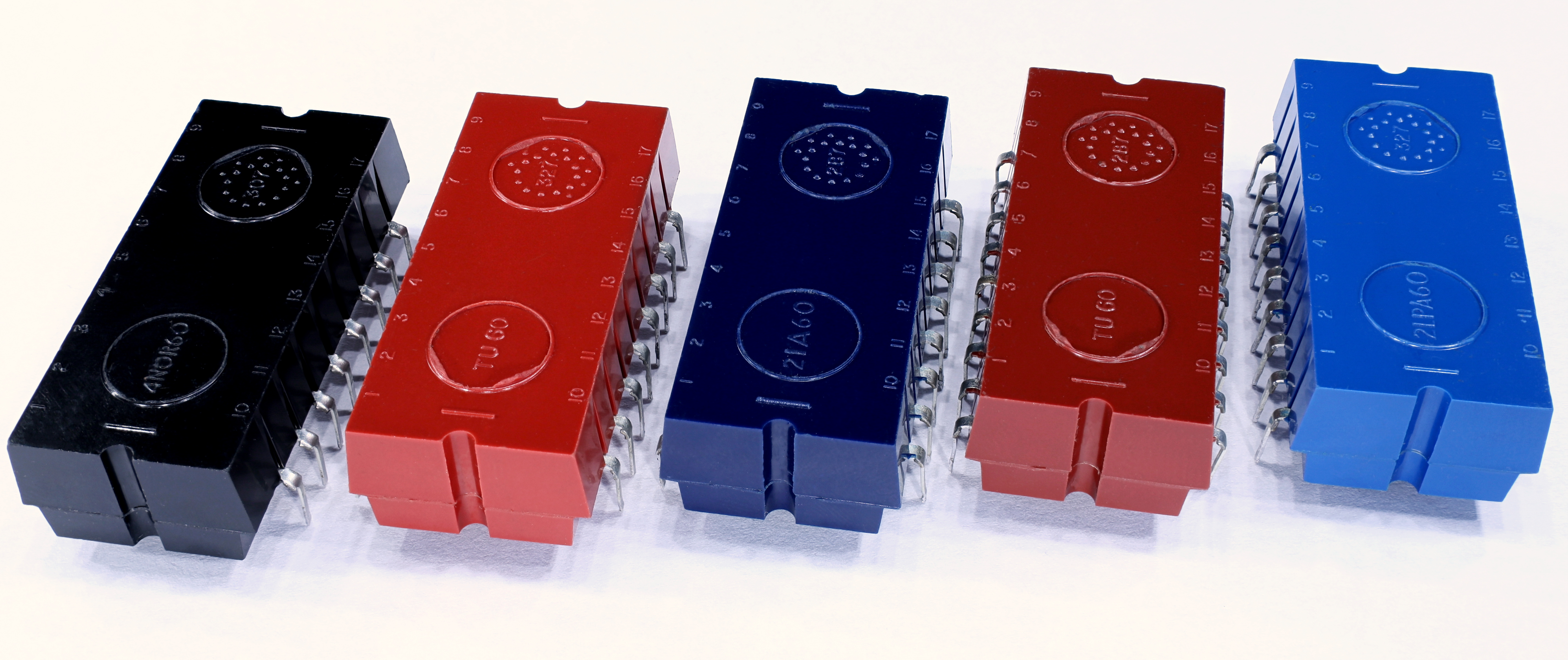
Top view

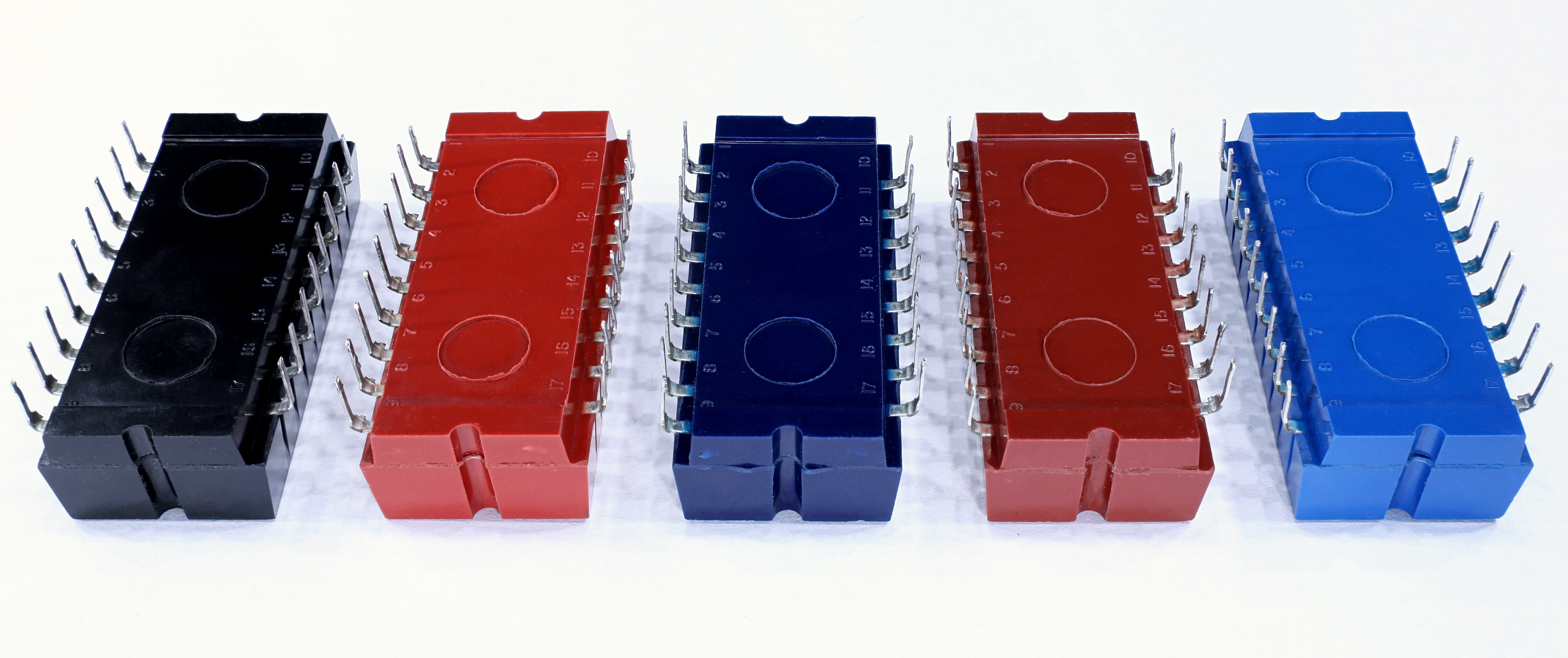
Bottom view

Examples of Printed Circuit Boards that uses the 60-series NORBIT 2 family

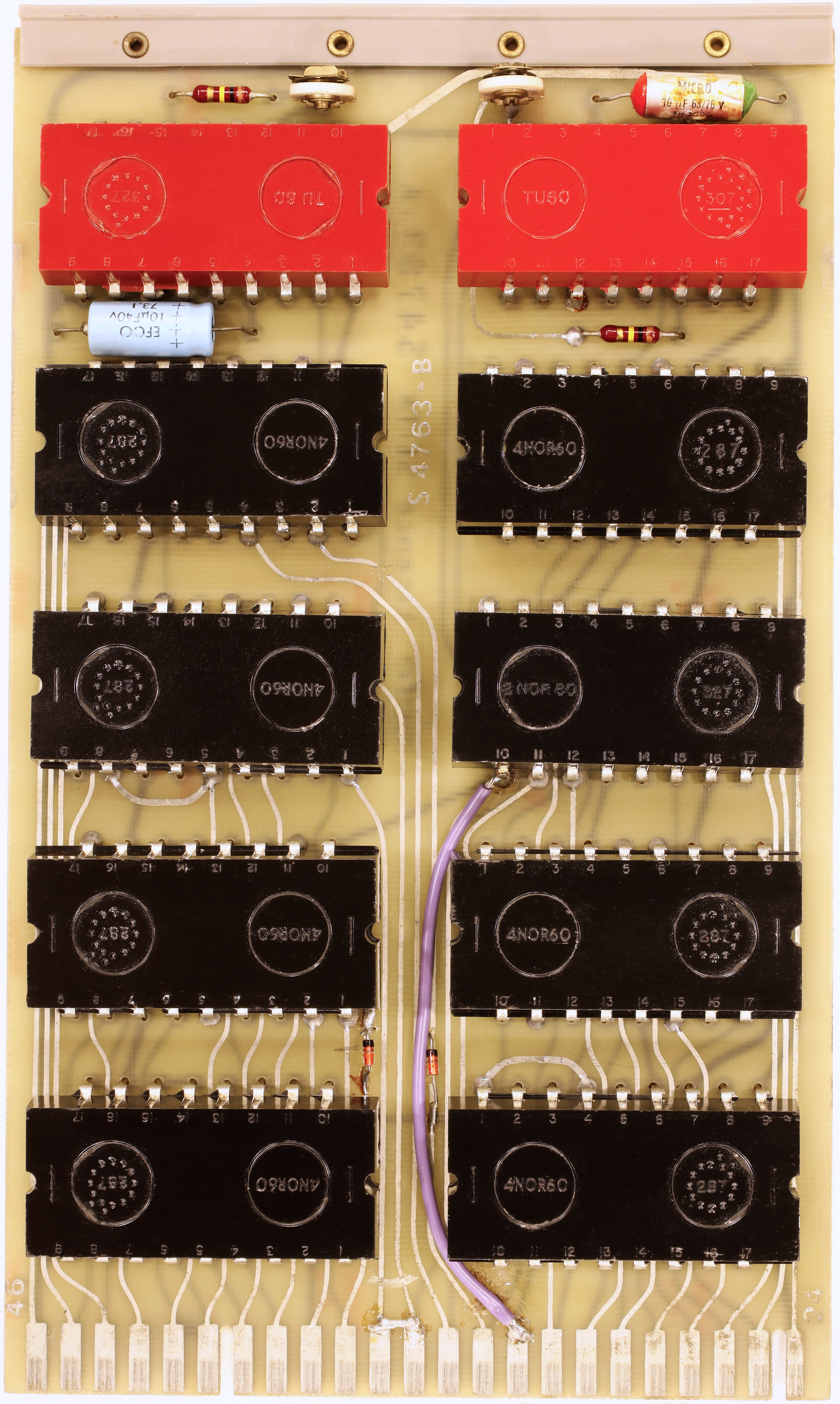

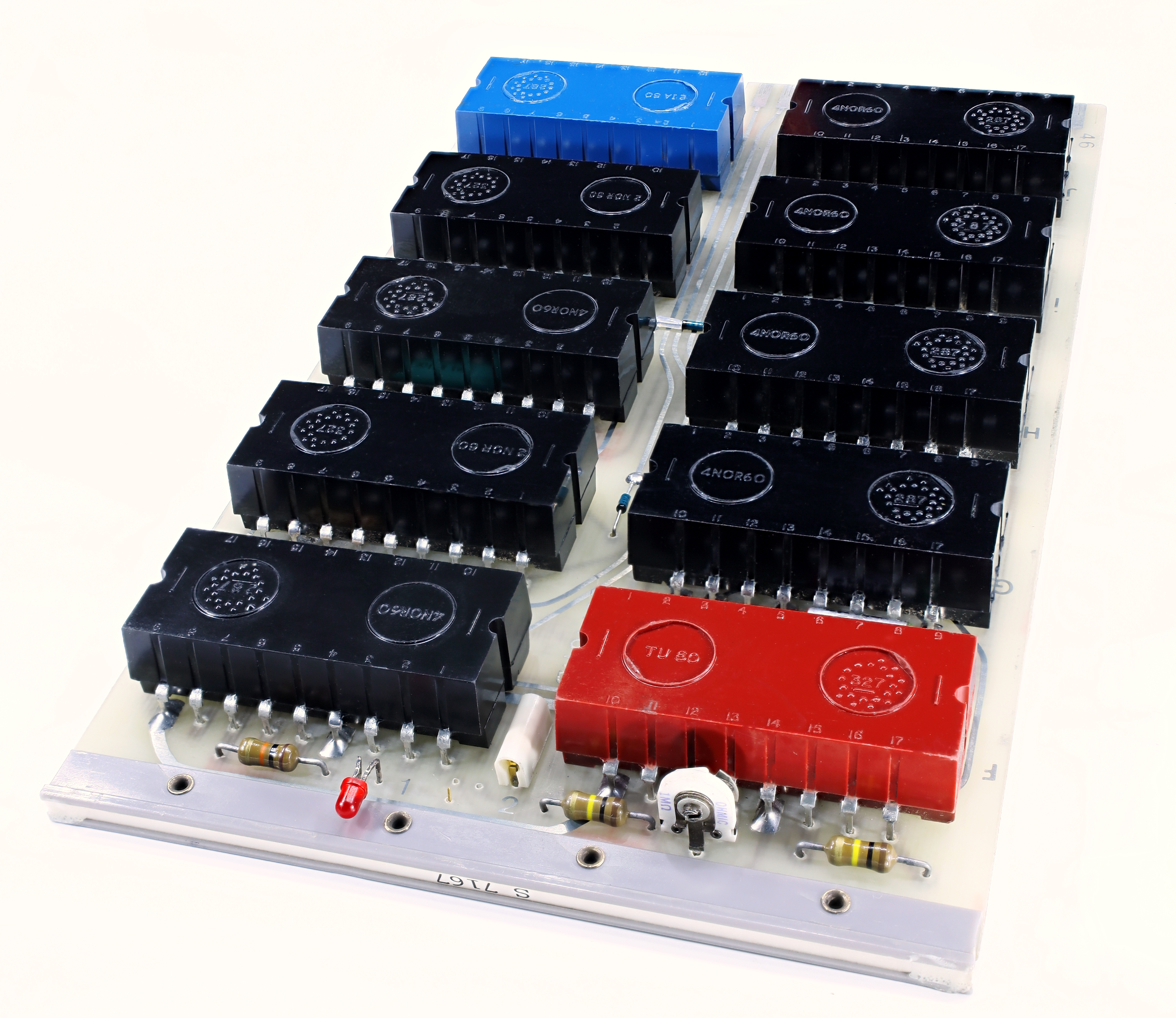

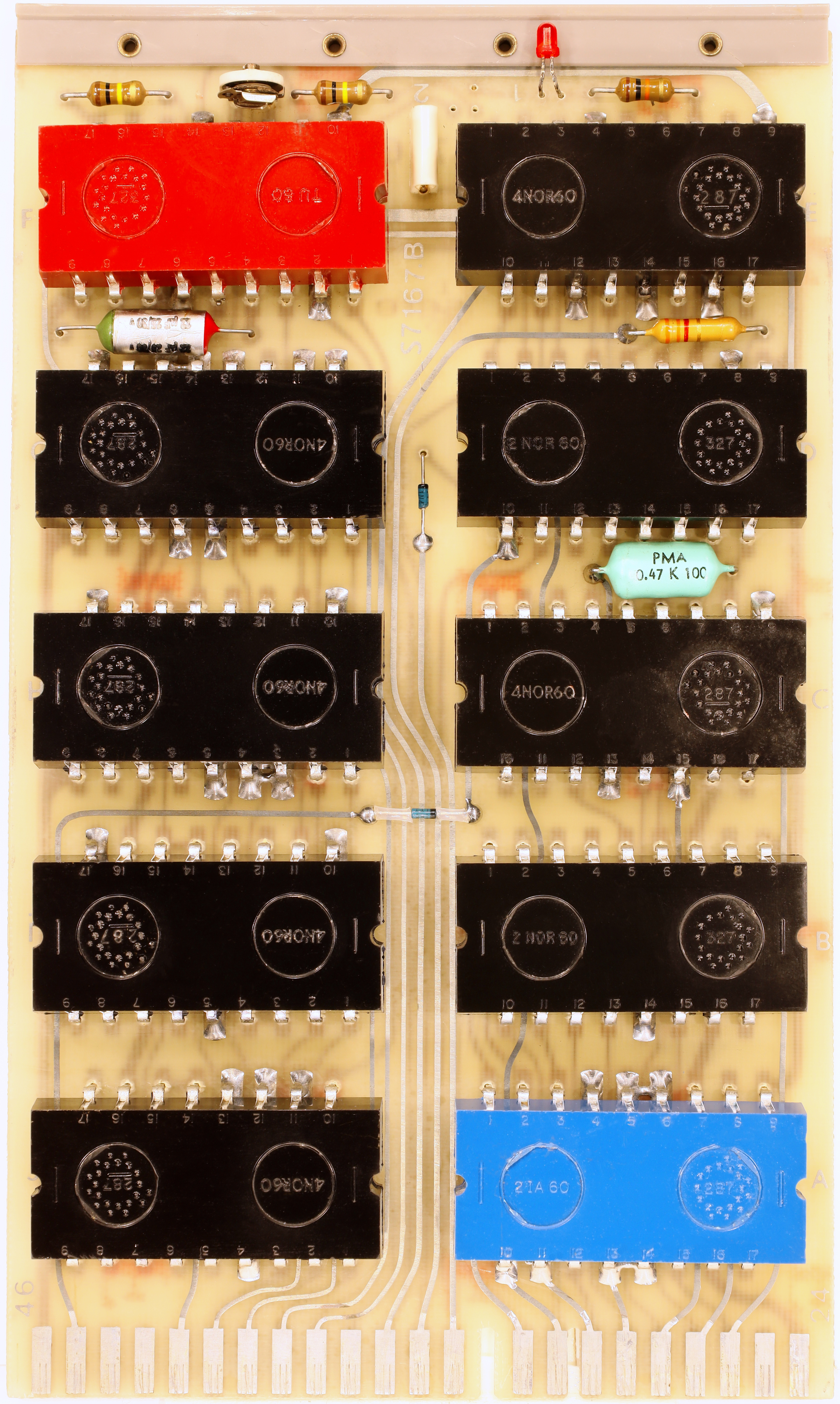

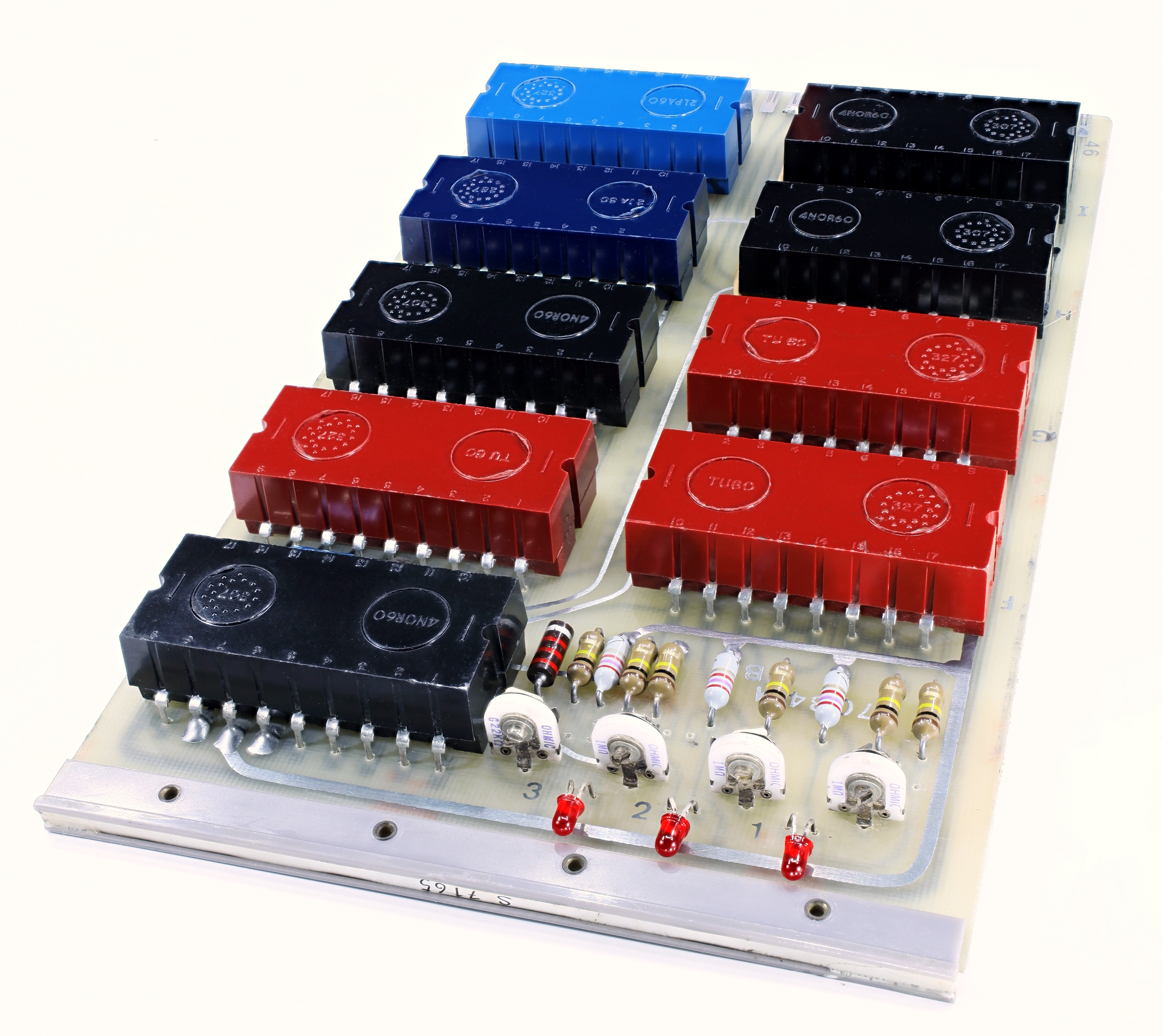

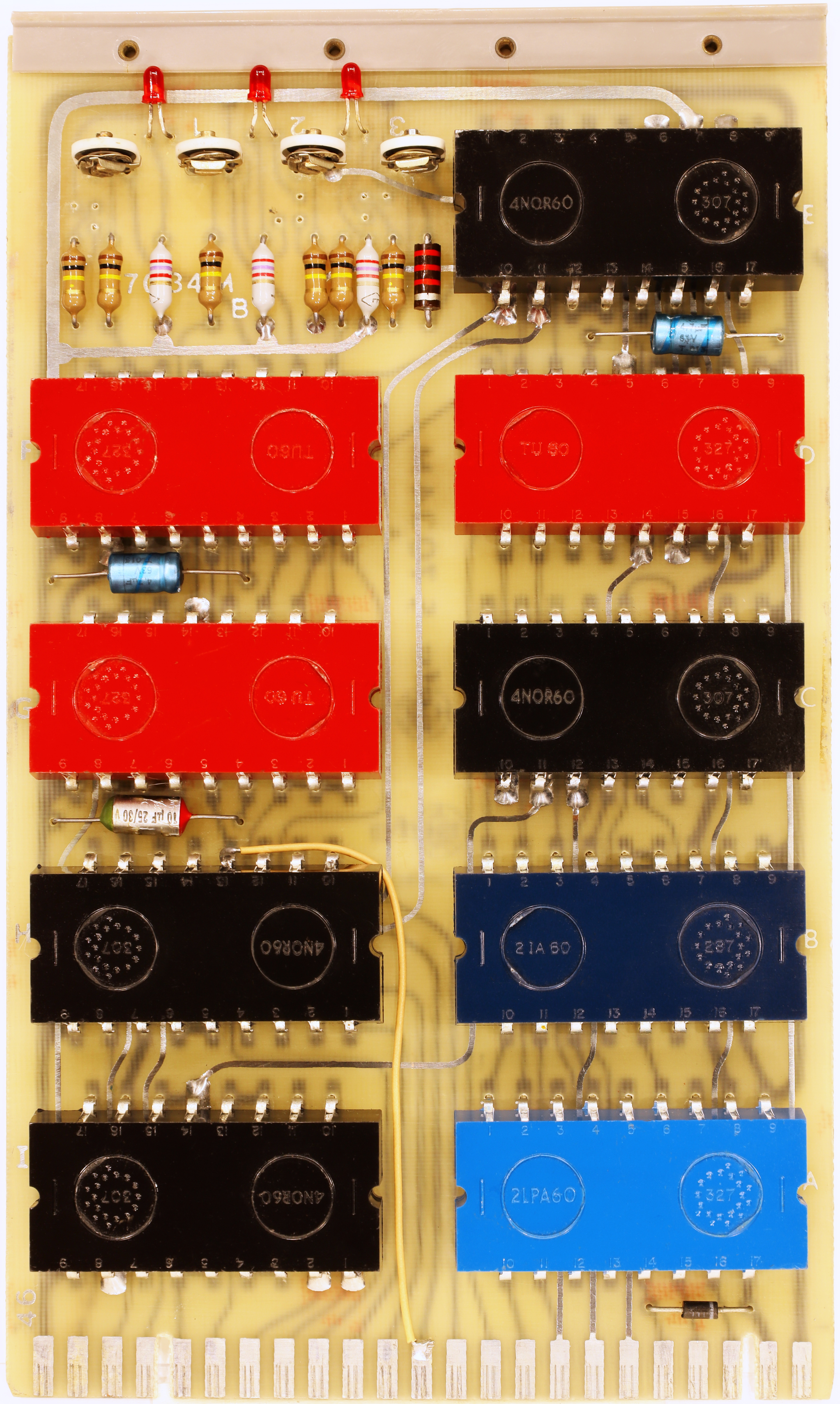

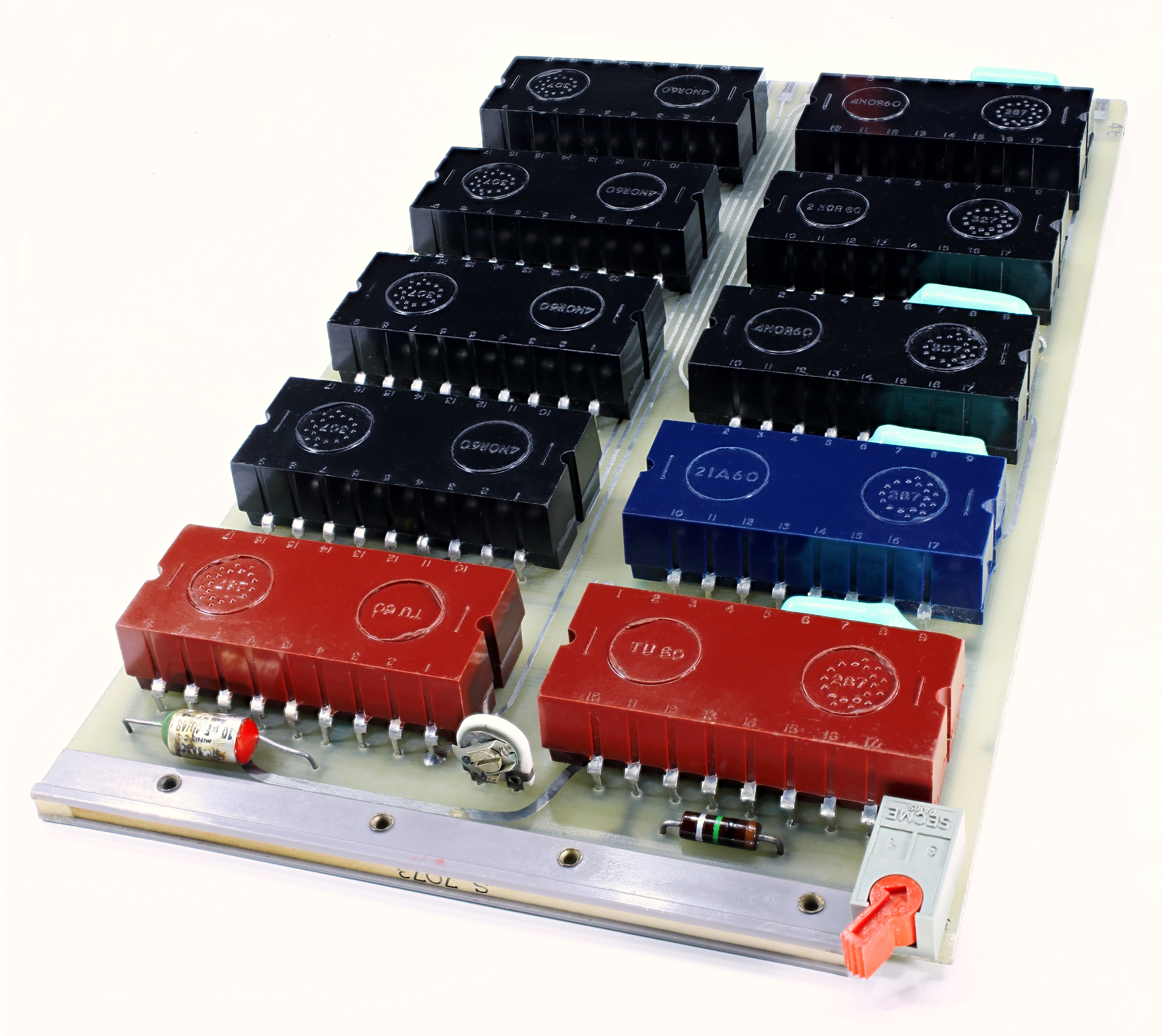

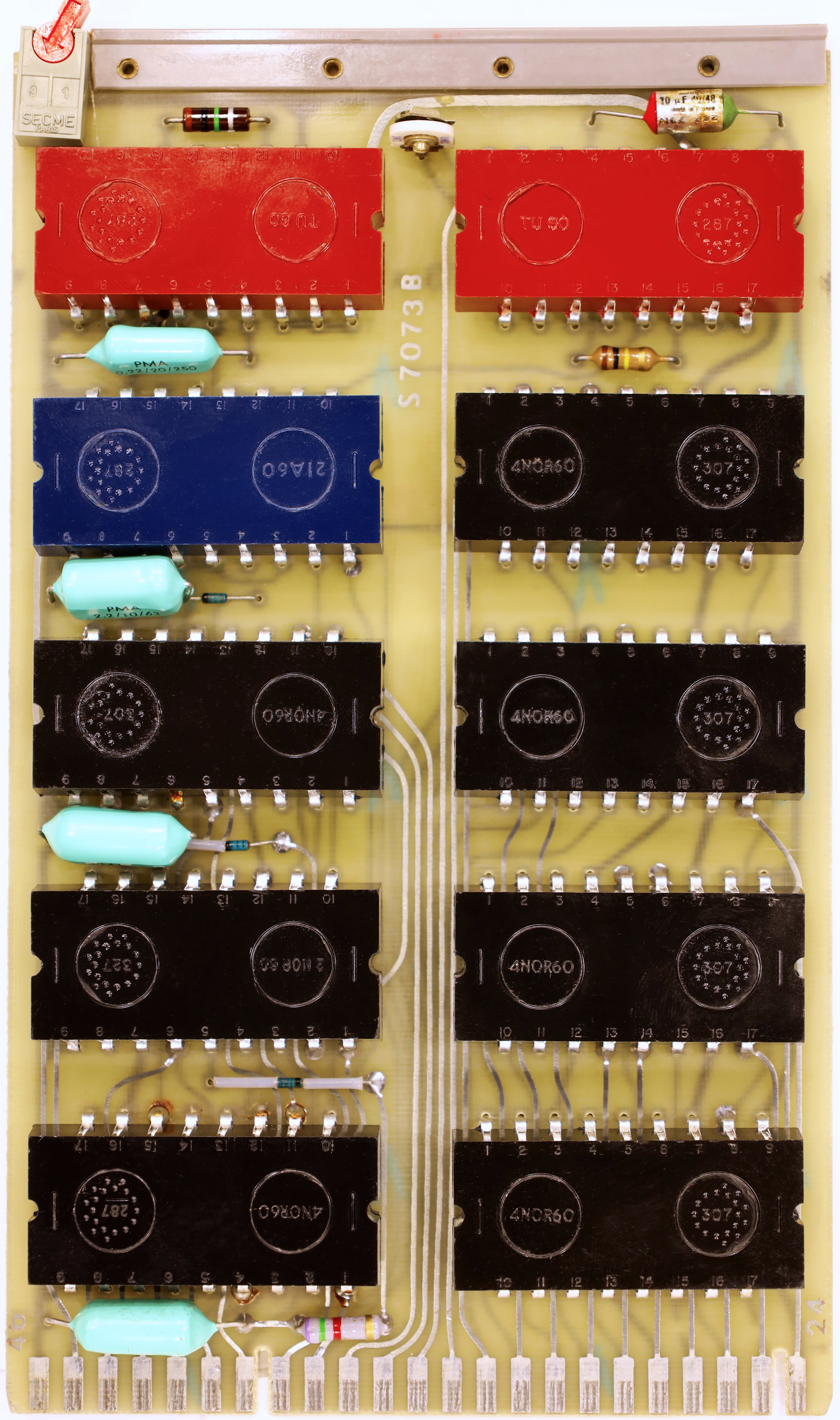

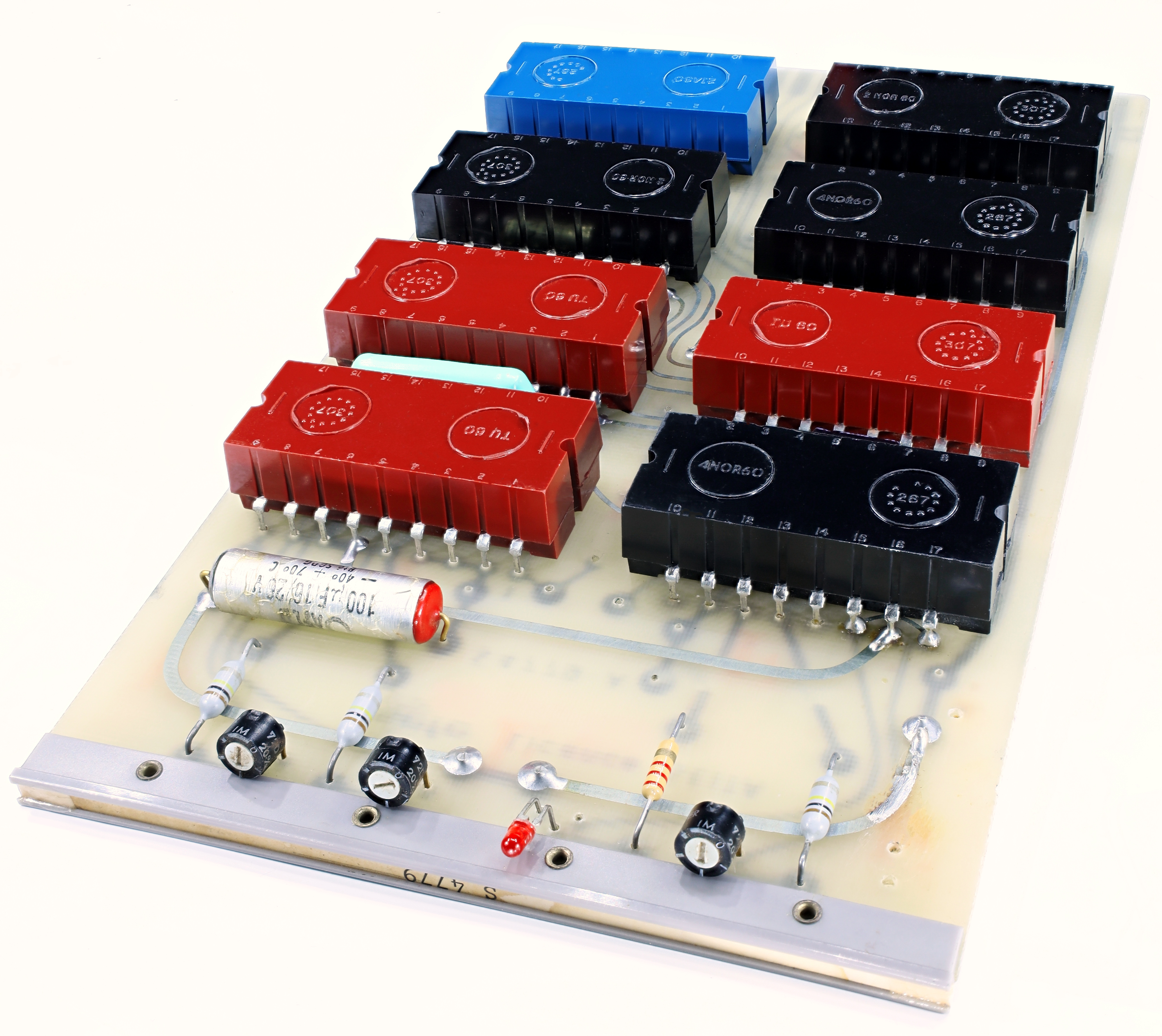

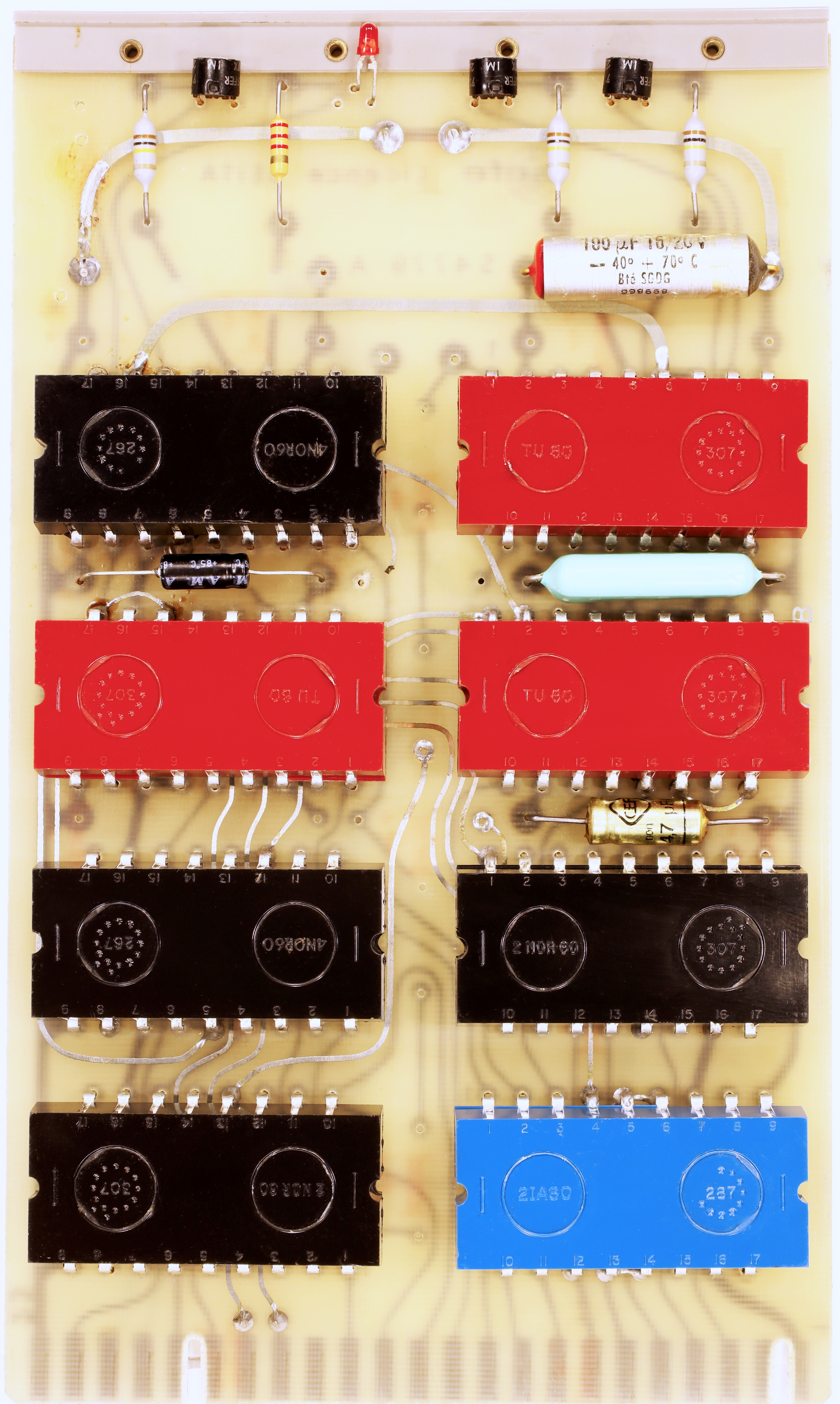

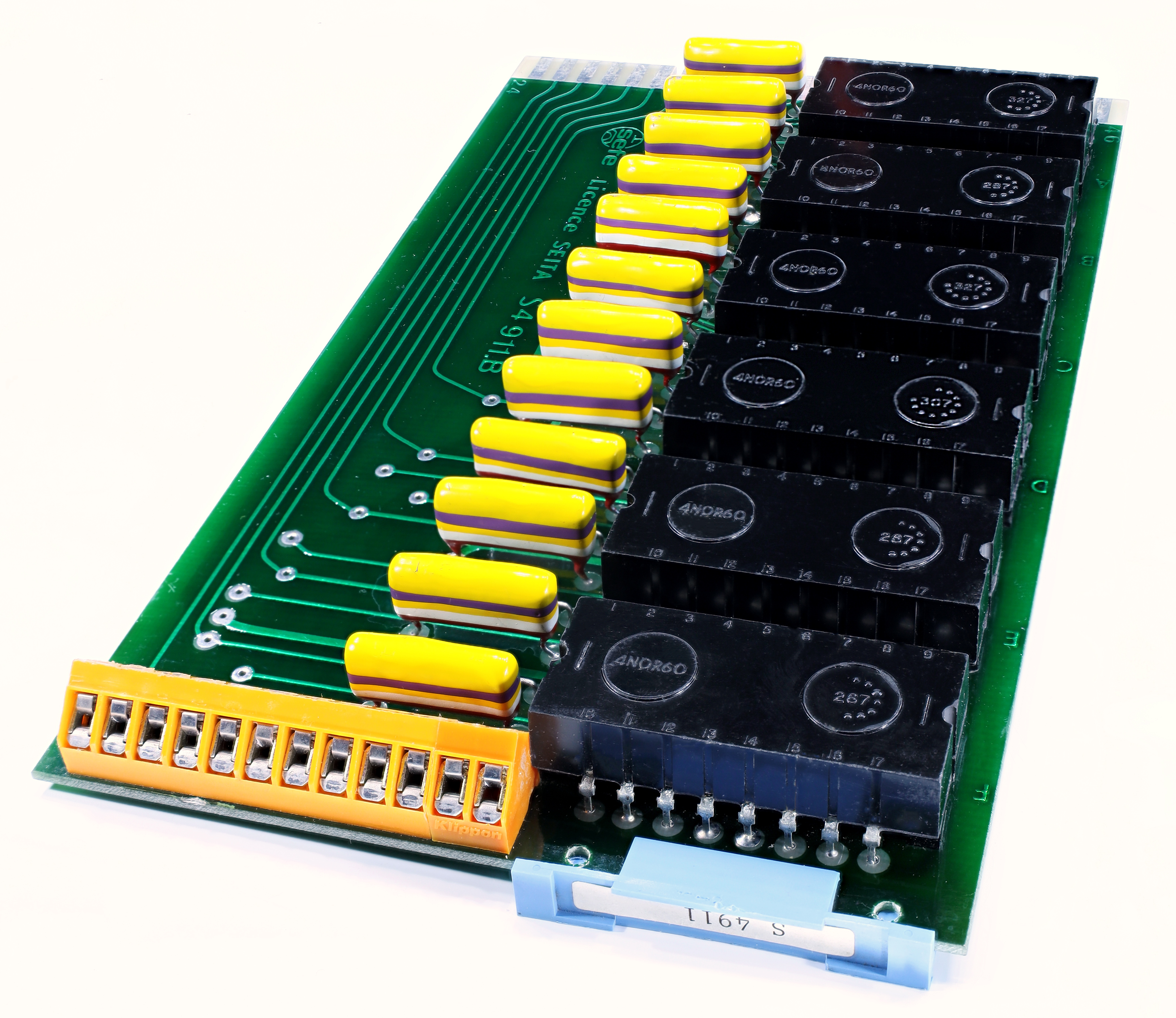

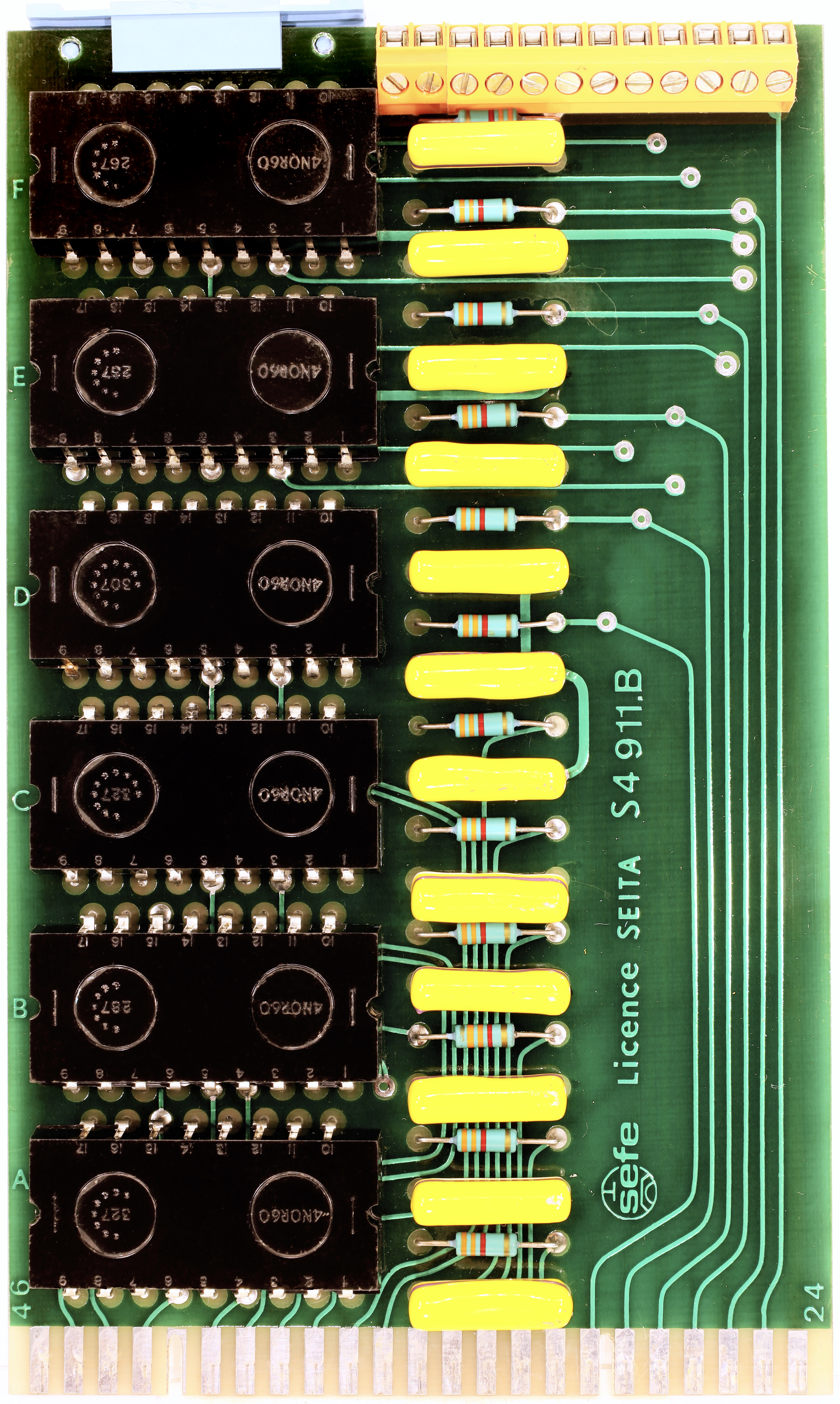

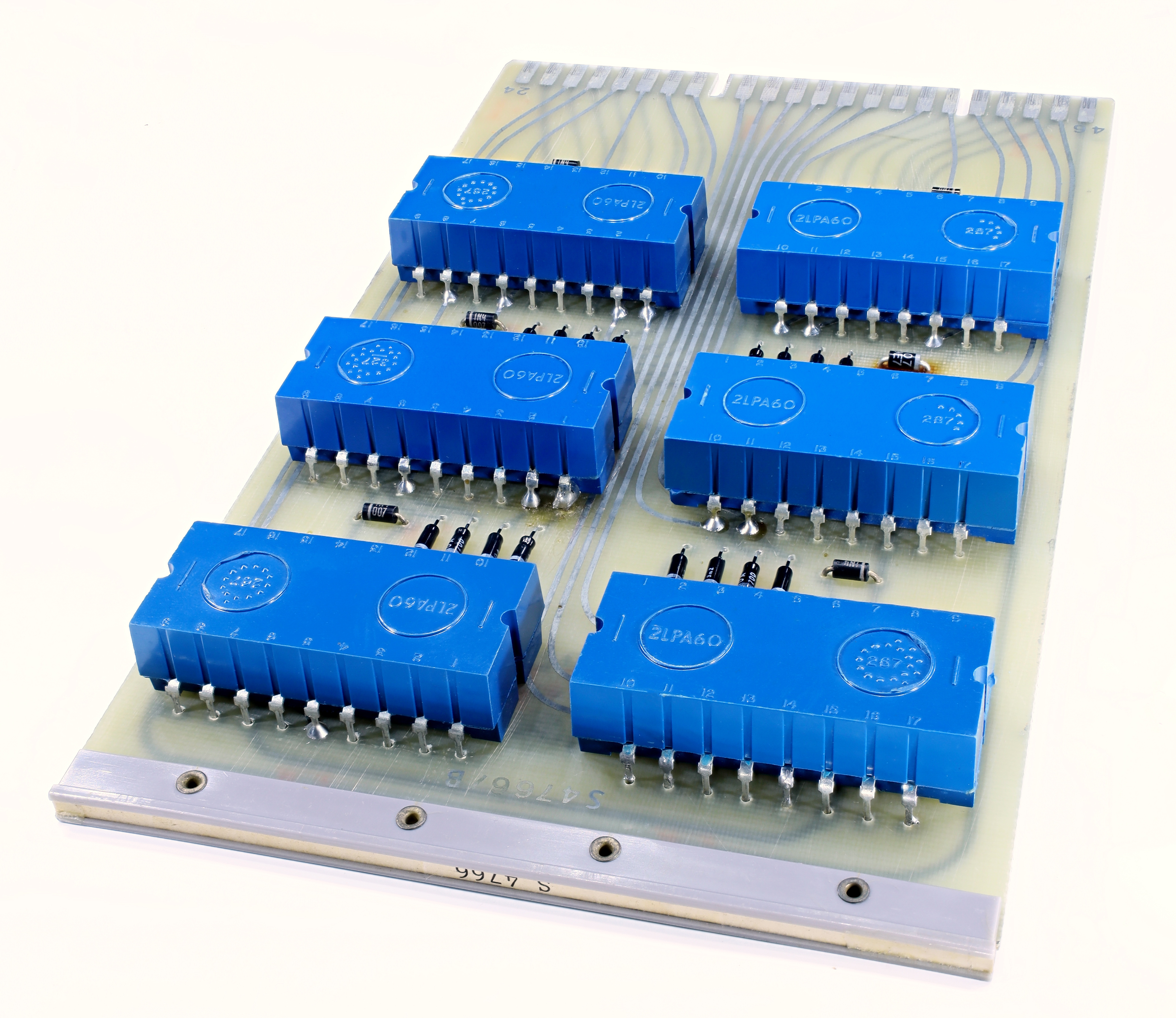

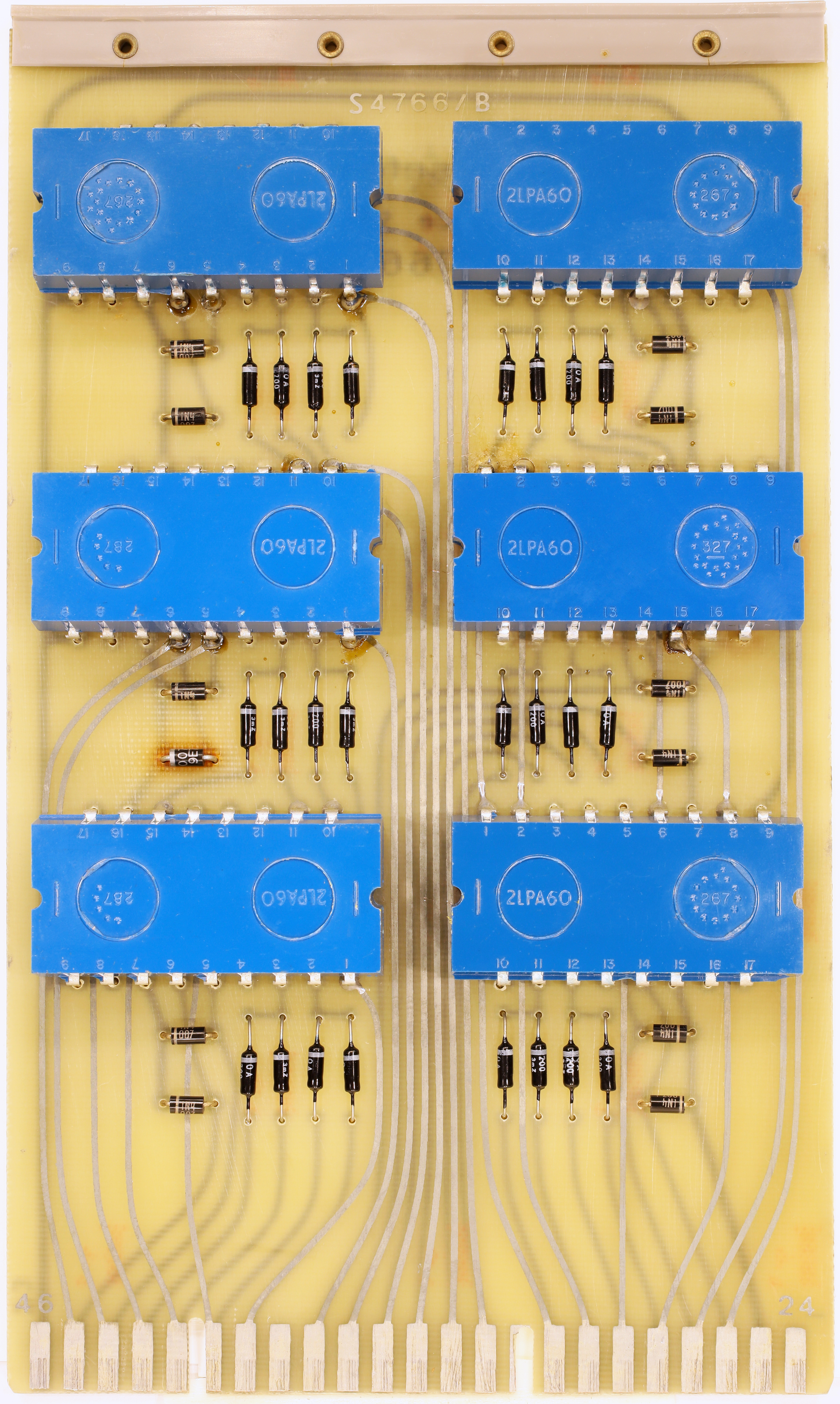

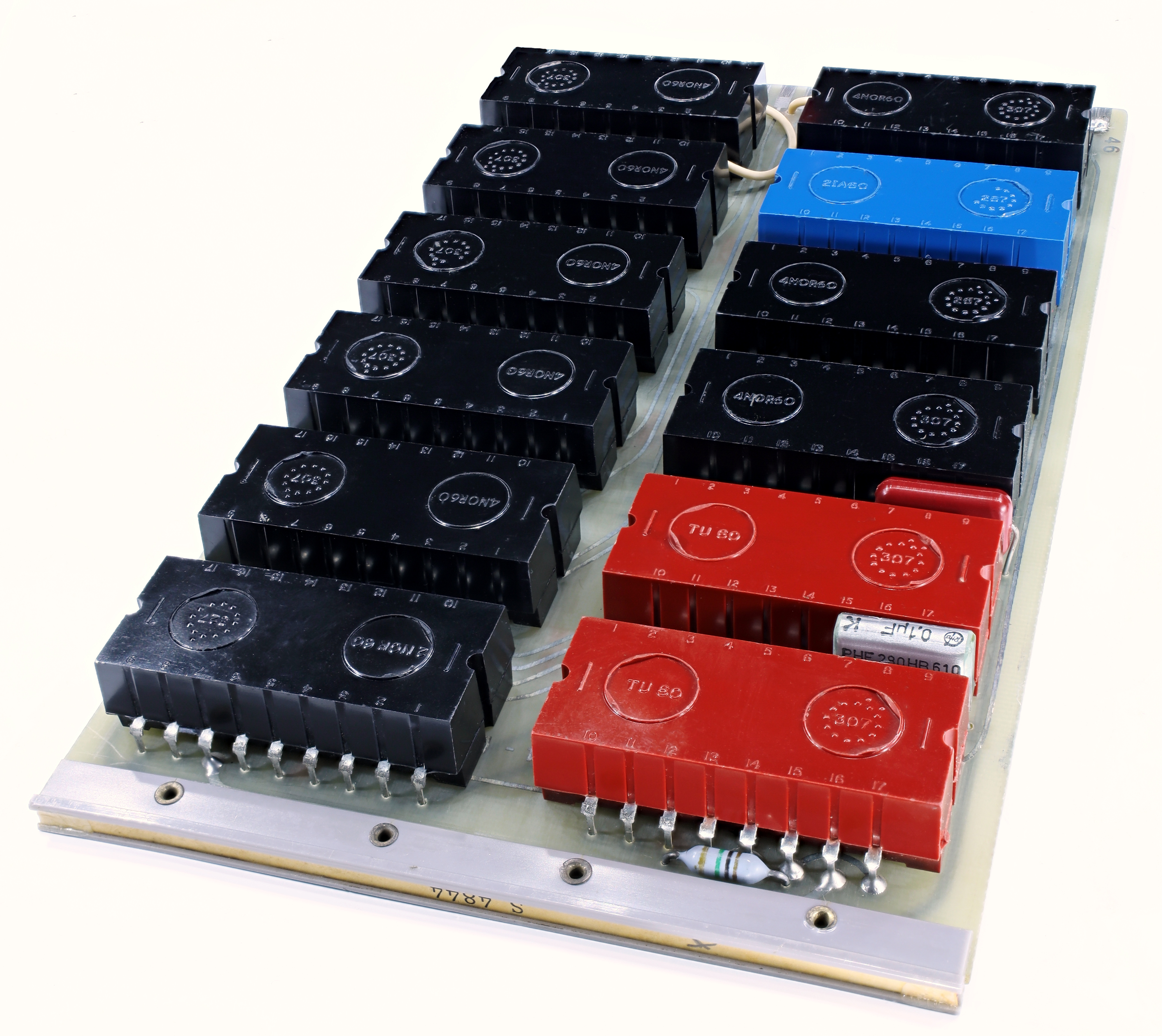

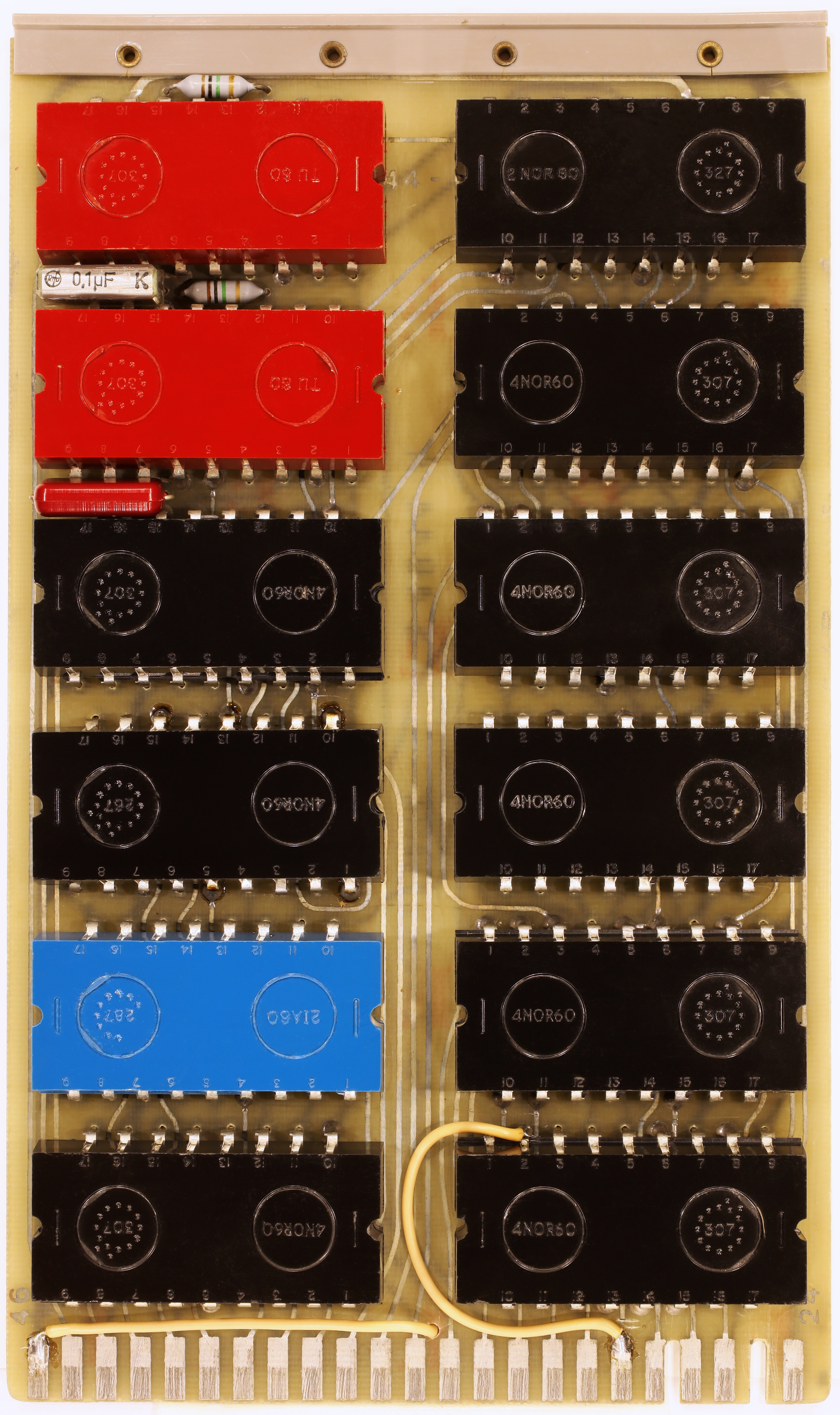

== See also ==
- Logic family
- fischertechnik
