= Fischertechnik =

Construction toy

- Type: Construction set
- Invented by: Artur Fischer
- Company: fischertechnik GmbH
- Country: Germany
- Availability: 1966–present
- Slogan: Building blocks for life
- Official website

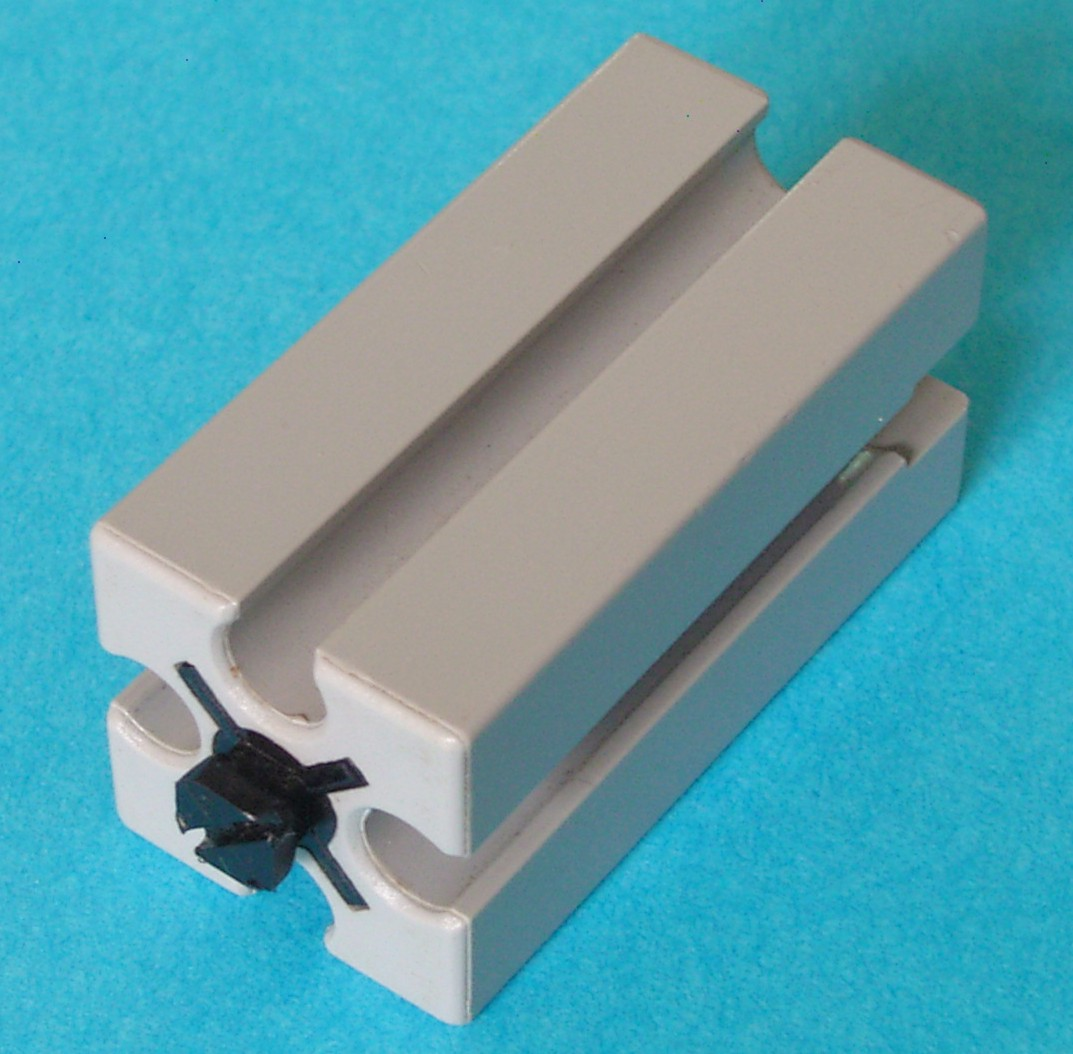
15×15×30 mm (plus peg) standard block in original gray color

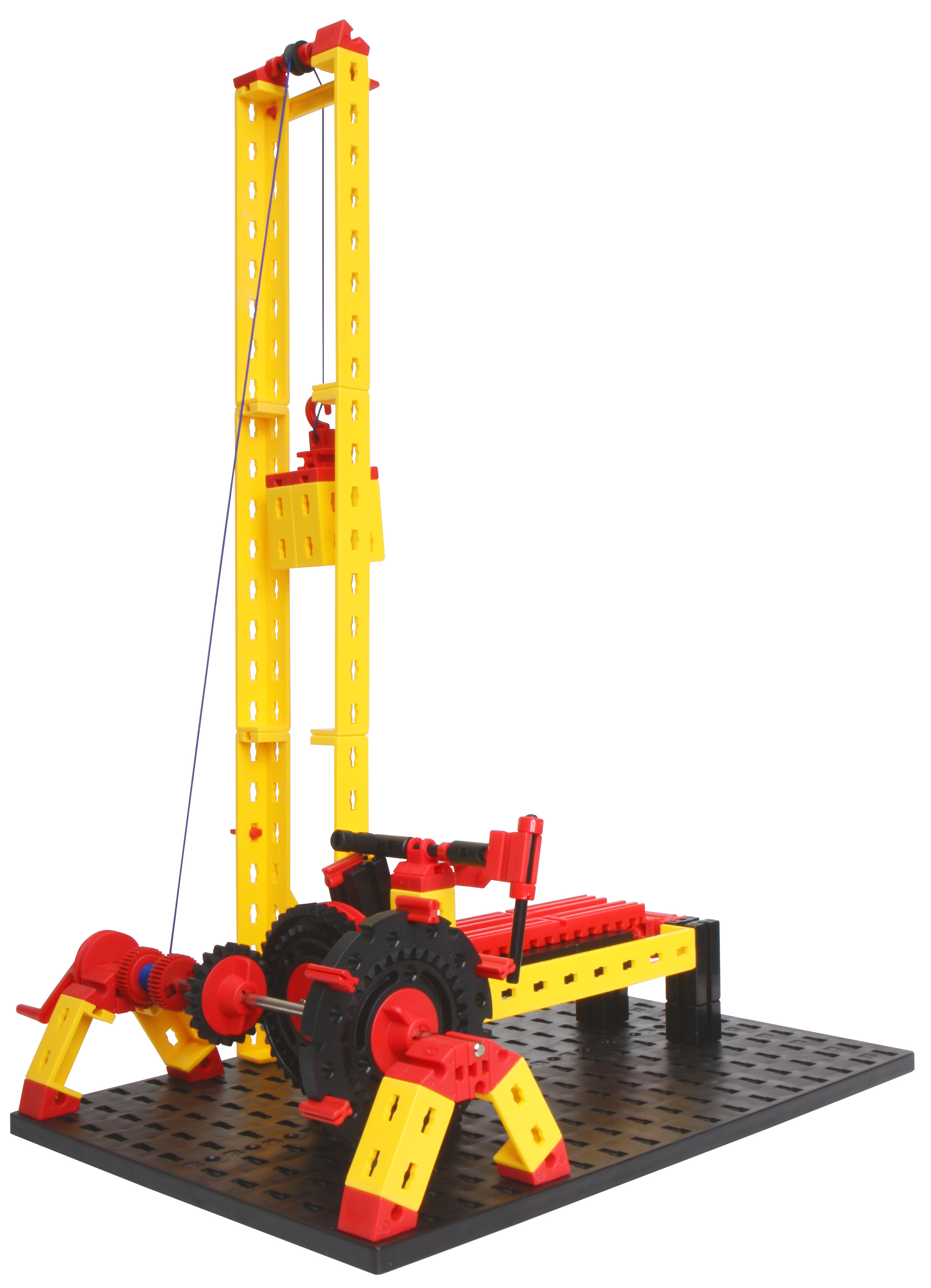
The fischertechnik da Vinci construction set can be used to recreate inventions by Leonardo da Vinci such as this file cutting machine.

Fischertechnik is a brand of construction toy. It was invented by Artur Fischer and is produced by fischertechnik GmbH in Waldachtal, Germany. Fans often refer to Fischertechnik as "FT" or "ft". It is used in education for teaching about simple machines, as well as motorization and mechanisms. The company also offers computer interface technology, which can be used to teach the theory of automation and robotics.

== Origin ==
The company is a German manufacturer of fasteners, and the original Fischertechnik set was intended as a Christmas (1964) novelty gift for engineers and buyers at industrial clients. The gifts proved popular, so for Christmas 1965, the company introduced its first building set for retail sale in Germany. In part, it has been claimed to foster education and interest in technology and science among the young. By about 1970, the construction sets were being sold in the United States at upscale toy retailers such as FAO Schwarz.

== Building blocks ==
The basic building blocks were of channel-and-groove design, manufactured of hard nylon. Basic blocks came in 15×15×15 and 15×15×30 millimeter sizes. A peg on one side of each block could be attached into a channel on any of the other five sides of a similar block, producing a tightly-fitting assembly that could assume almost any shape. Red cladding plates could be used to complete the exterior surfaces of the models.

== Accessories ==
The original blocks were characteristically gray with red accessories such as wheels and angled blocks. Electric motors, power sources, and gears were soon added to mobilize models. Additional building pieces such as struts were added in “statics” sets, allowing the construction of realistic-looking bridges and tower cranes. A few Fischertechnik girders actually are made of aluminum. At least one company made Fischertechnik-compatible aluminum bars of any desired length. To teach the physics of such models, some sets included measuring devices, so that trigonometric vectors could be calculated and tested.

== Electrical and electronic components ==
The early sets were sophisticated and were often used by engineers to teach and simulate industrial robotics. This use was advanced by the addition of electrical and electronic components such as microswitches, magnetic-sensing reed switches, and photocells, which sensed position and provided input to motors. With the basic electronic block (Grundbaustein), which contained an operational amplifier, Schmitt trigger and delay line circuits could be built. In the late 1970s, electronic binary-logic modules (AND, NAND, OR, NOR, flip-flops) were introduced, so that models could make some branching decisions. Pneumatic devices were made available to provide gripping ability. By the late 1980s, process control CPU modules were added, so that sequences movements could be preprogrammed and executed, first using “Lucky Logic” (LLWIN) software.

== Kits for younger ages ==
As Lego became more sophisticated with its Mindstorms line, Fischertechnik attempted to move down into less technical, more “fun”, building kits for younger ages. The parts were molded from more colorful plastics, and small building sets were developed for simple models such as vehicles. However, the Fischer products were more expensive and had far fewer parts that replicated everyday objects than Lego. Especially in the United States, Fischertechnik never achieved parity with Lego in the general construction toy market, and FT is still more positioned as a product for schools, engineers, and hobbyists. The sets are not as available at retail as Lego products in the United States, or even in Europe.

== Robotic process control ==
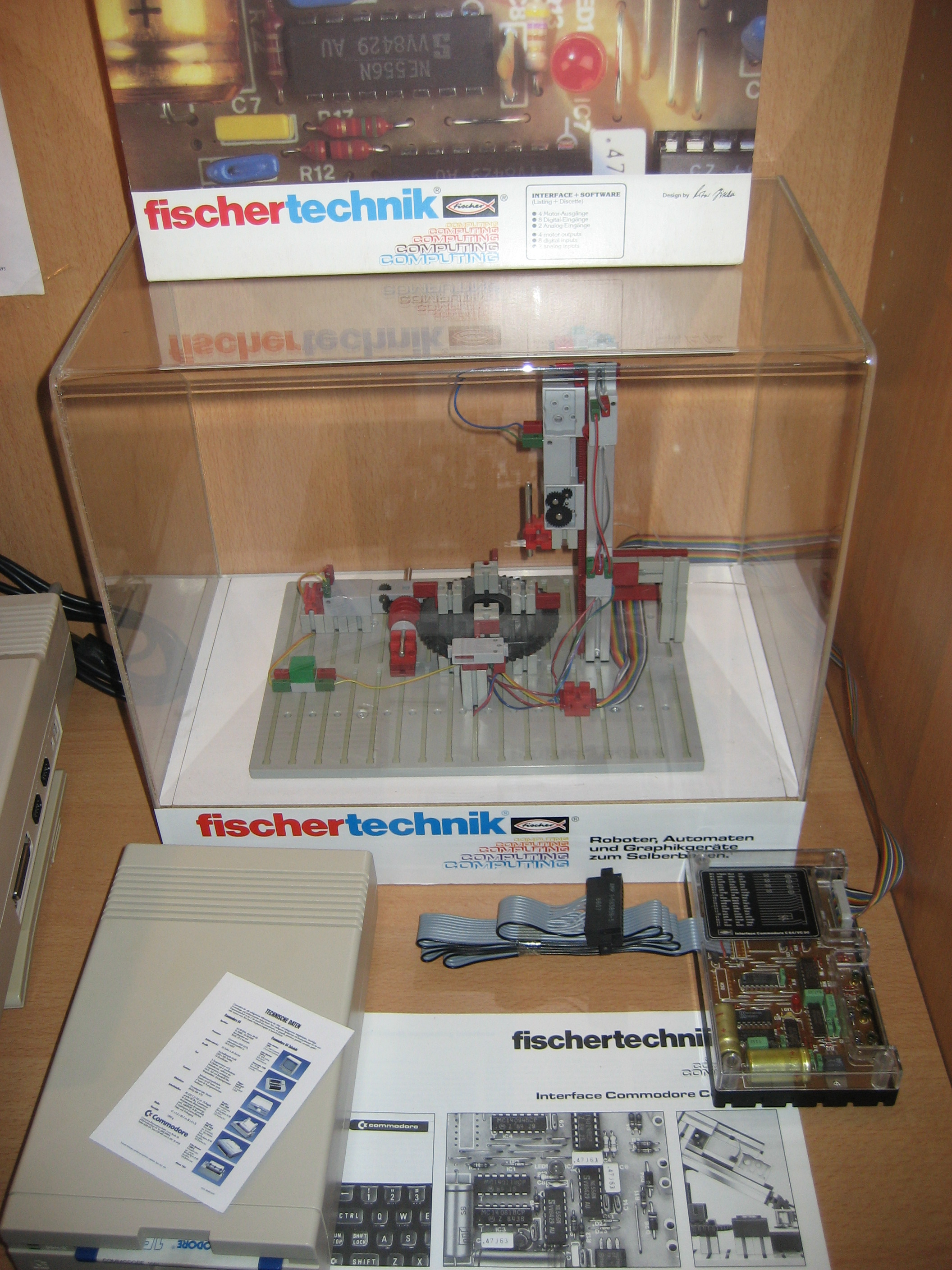
Fischertechnik computing with a Commodore 64 interface

By 2006, Fischertechnik sets were available for robotic process control using “Robo-pro” software (the successor to Lucky-logic), on-board process controllers with flash memory, infrared and radio-frequency remote control, and pneumatic-activation. Robotic models could follow preprogrammed routes or lines on the floor, sense obstructions and change course, detect and move objects, and simulate everyday devices such as vending machines, passenger elevator systems, and traffic-control lights. In early 2010, Fischertechnik introduced the ROBO TX Explorer kit, which includes a color sensor.

== Sets ==
Fischertechnik has produced myriad different sets over the years, and the company has several times renamed existing sets. Moreover, there have been as many as five different lines of these sets (often referred to as "A", "B", "C", "D", and "E" in fan circles) with similar but differing components (all compatible, of course). Roughly these fit into the production years 1967–1971, 1972–1975, 1976–1981, 1981–1984 and 1984–1991. The A line featured predominantly black-and-white images, whereas the "B" line features the "Oscar DuJouet 1970" award on the box design. "C" saw the introduction of black plastic cogs (earlier they were all red), and "D" saw the introduction of yellow plastic "statics" (whereas before they were grey).

The following equivalencies can help make sense of some of the core sets:

- Start 300 = Start 200 + 50/3 = Start 100 + 50/2 + 50/3 = Start 50 + 50/1 + 50/2 + 50/3
- Hobby 1 = UT1 = selected parts from Start 300 (but significantly abbreviated)
- Hobby 2 = UT2 = Mot1 + Mot2 + Mot3 (The Hobby 2 / UT2 lacks the battery box that comes with Mot1.)
- Hobby 3 = UT3 = EM1 + EM2 + EM3 (The "EM" stands for "Electro-Mechanical".)
- Hobby 4 = UT4 = EC1 + EC2 + EC3 (The "EC" stands for "Electronic".)
- Hobby S = Start 50S + 50S/1 + 50S/2 + 50S/3 (Note that those are "S" = "structural", not a "5".)

Note that prior to the Fischertechnik "C" line (1976?), the starter sets didn't have as many parts, and neither did their add-on kits (50/1, 50/2, 50/3). Because the older manuals lack copyright dates or official line designations, it is difficult to distinguish sets without in-depth knowledge of what was actually in the box for each line and set.

More recently, Fischertechnik has started producing a whole line of kits specialized for the construction of particular models, like boats, airplanes, bridges, cranes, etc. This is something of a departure from their traditional niche producing generic sets from which (literally) hundreds of different models can be built. Fischertechnik has also started producing advanced robotic sets, including battery packs, remote controls, and programmable control boards.

== See also ==
- Lego Technic
- NORBIT
- Free Universal Construction Kit – 3D-printable open source construction toy
