= Artur Fischer =

German inventor (1919–2016)

- Born: 31 December 1919; Tumlingen, Germany
- Died: 27 January 2016 (aged 96); Tumlingen, Germany
- Citizenship: German
- Known for: Wall plug Flash synchronization Fischertechnik
- Spouse: Rita Gonser (1945–2013)
- Children: Klaus Fischer, Margot Fischer-Weber
- Awards: Werner von Siemens Ring (1990); Order of Merit of the Federal Republic of Germany (1999); European Inventor Award (2014)
- Scientific career
- Fields: Inventor
- Institutions: Fischerwerke company

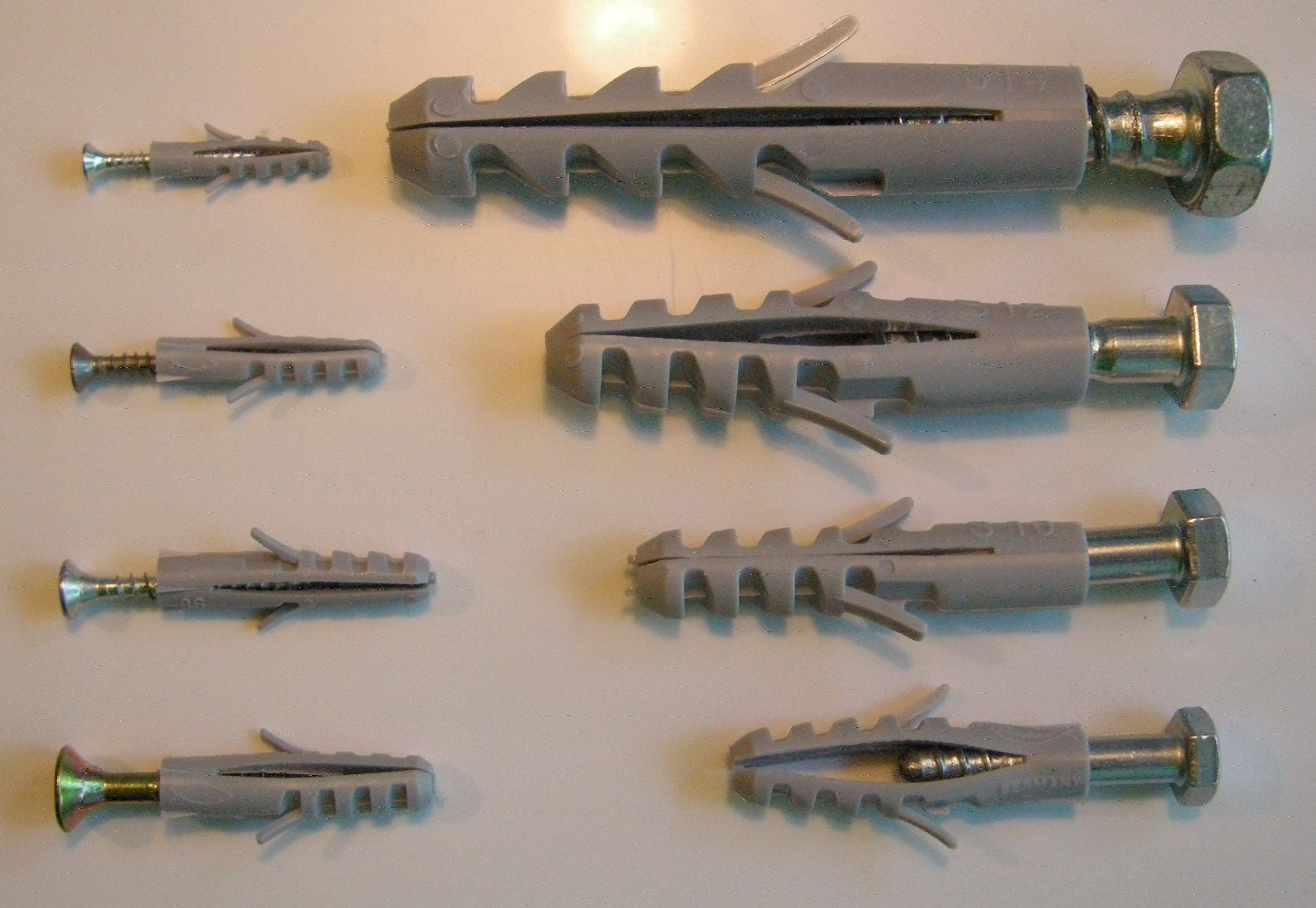
Typical Fischer-Plugs

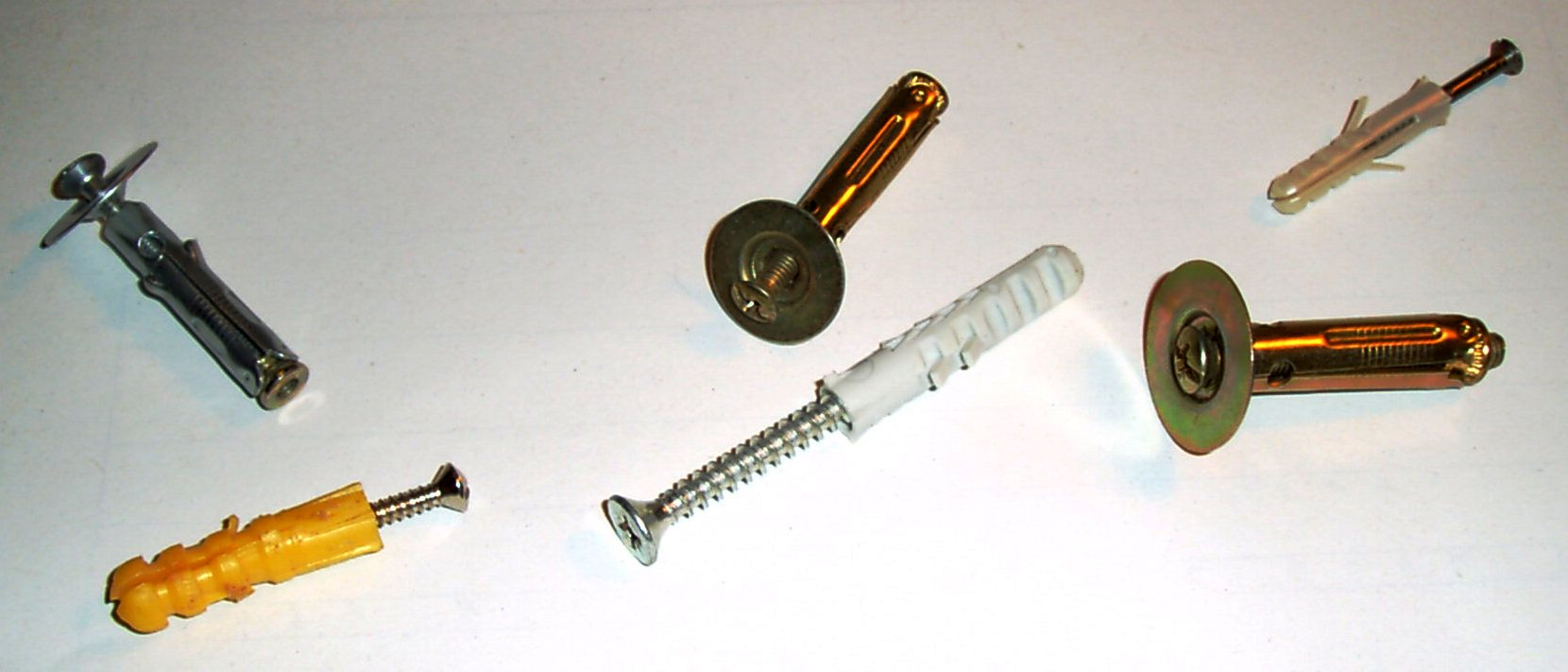
Fischer invented wall plugs to hold screws (not all of Fischer Brand)

Artur Fischer (31 December 1919 – 27 January 2016) was a German inventor. He is best known for inventing an expanding plastic version of the wall plug.

== Early life and wartime service ==
Fischer was born in Tumlingen on 31 December 1919, the son of the village tailor Georg Fischer. His mother Pauline, who ironed collars to supplement the family's income, recognised his mechanical aptitude, helped him establish a workbench at home and bought him a construction set. He left school at the age of 13 to train as a locksmith and later joined the Hitler Youth.

During World War II, Fischer served as an aircraft mechanic in the Luftwaffe, the air force of Nazi Germany. He was assigned to Jagdgeschwader 52 and survived the Battle of Stalingrad, leaving the encirclement aboard one of the last aircraft. Later in the war, he was captured in Italy and transferred to a prisoner-of-war camp in England. He returned to Tumlingen in 1946 and found employment as an assistant at an engineering company. He subsequently began producing lighters and loom switches from military scrap, and in 1948 founded his own company, the Fischer Group.

== Synchronized photo flash ==
In 1949, he invented synchronized flash light photography, which was later purchased by the camera company Agfa. Inspired by his inability to photograph his young daughter indoors, his insight was to synchronize an electronic flash with the camera shutter.

== Wall plug ==
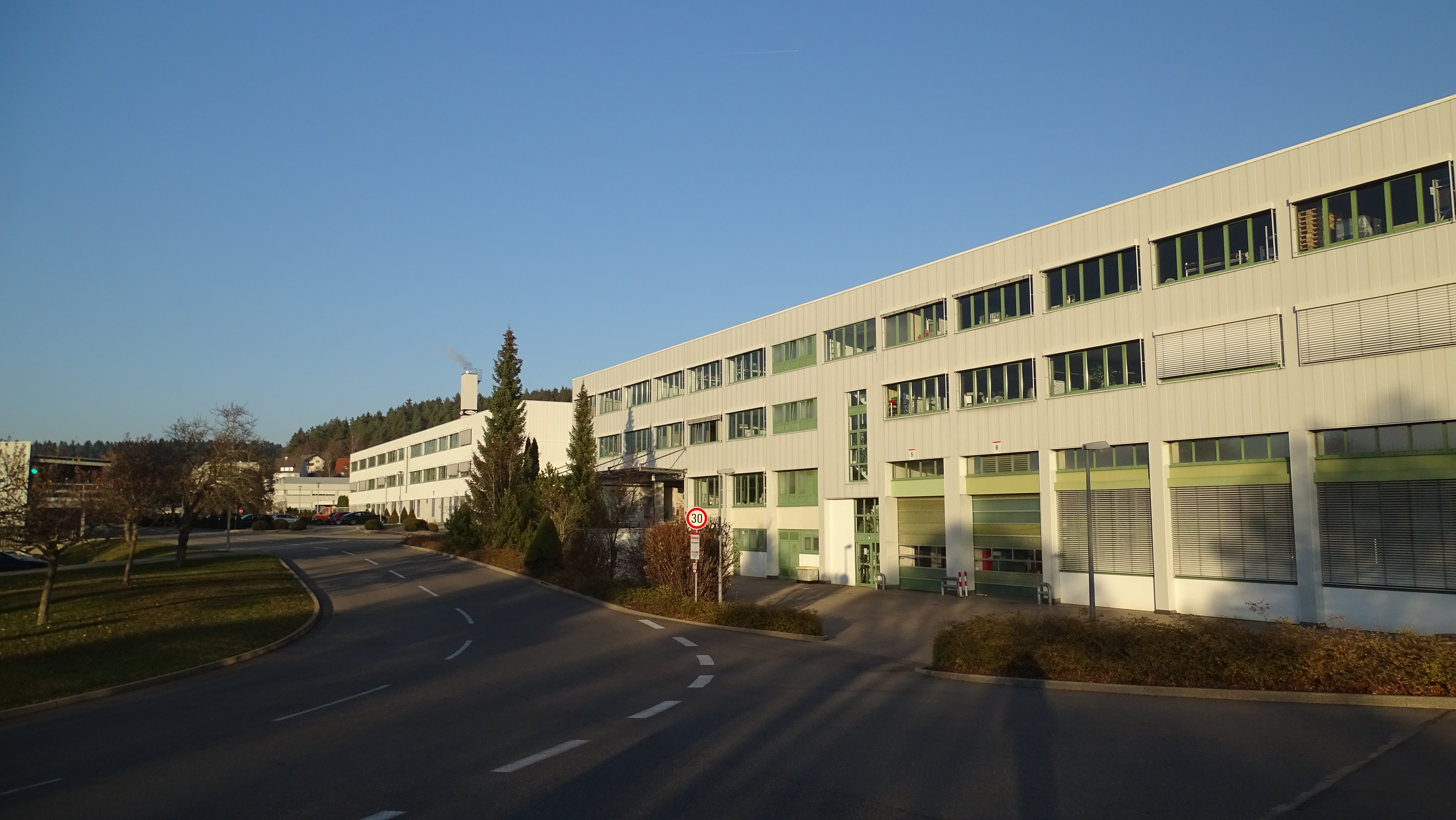
Fischerwerk in Tumlingen, Waldachtal in the Black Forest.

His most famous invention is the grey "S Plug" (Split-)Wallplug made from plastic materials (Polyamide) which is available in various shapes and sizes since 1958 (see Wall plug). This was the most universally suitable and widely adopted version of John Joseph Rawlings 1911 invention, the ‘Rawlplug’ a fibre-bonded wallplug. Fischer held over 1100 patents and overtook Thomas Alva Edison, who held 1093 patents. Fischer also held 5867 trade rights and invented fischertechnik.

Further inventions are (bone-)plugs for fixing bone fractures and one of Fischer’s most recent inventions was a gadget that makes it possible to hold and cut the top off an egg of any size. He got started on the problem when a hotel owner complained to him that his guests, on opening their boiled eggs for breakfast, always made a mess.
