= Waldachtal =

- Municipality
- Coat of arms

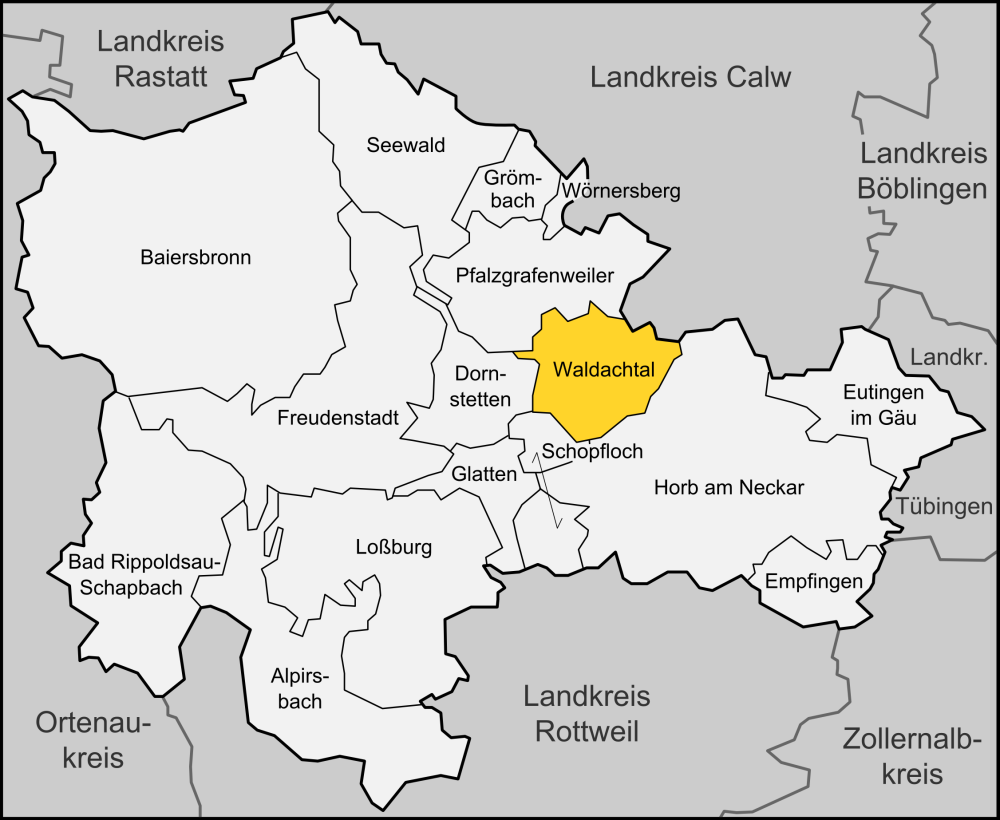
- Location of Waldachtal within Freudenstadt district
- Interactive map of Waldachtal
- Location within Germany Location within Baden-Württemberg
- Coordinates: 48°29′22″N 8°33′53″E
- Country: Germany
- State: Baden-Württemberg
- Admin. region: Karlsruhe
- District: Freudenstadt
- Subdivisions: 5

Government
  - Mayor (2022–30): Annick Grassi

Area
  - Total: 29.87 km^{2} (11.53 sq mi)
- Elevation: 599 m (1,965 ft)

Population (2025-12-31)
  - Total: 6,314
  - Density: 211.4/km^{2} (547.5/sq mi)
- Time zone: UTC+01:00 (CET)
  - Summer (DST): UTC+02:00 (CEST)
- Postal codes: 72178
- Dialling codes: 07443, 07445, 07486
- Vehicle registration: FDS, HCH, HOR, WOL
- Website: www.waldachtal.de

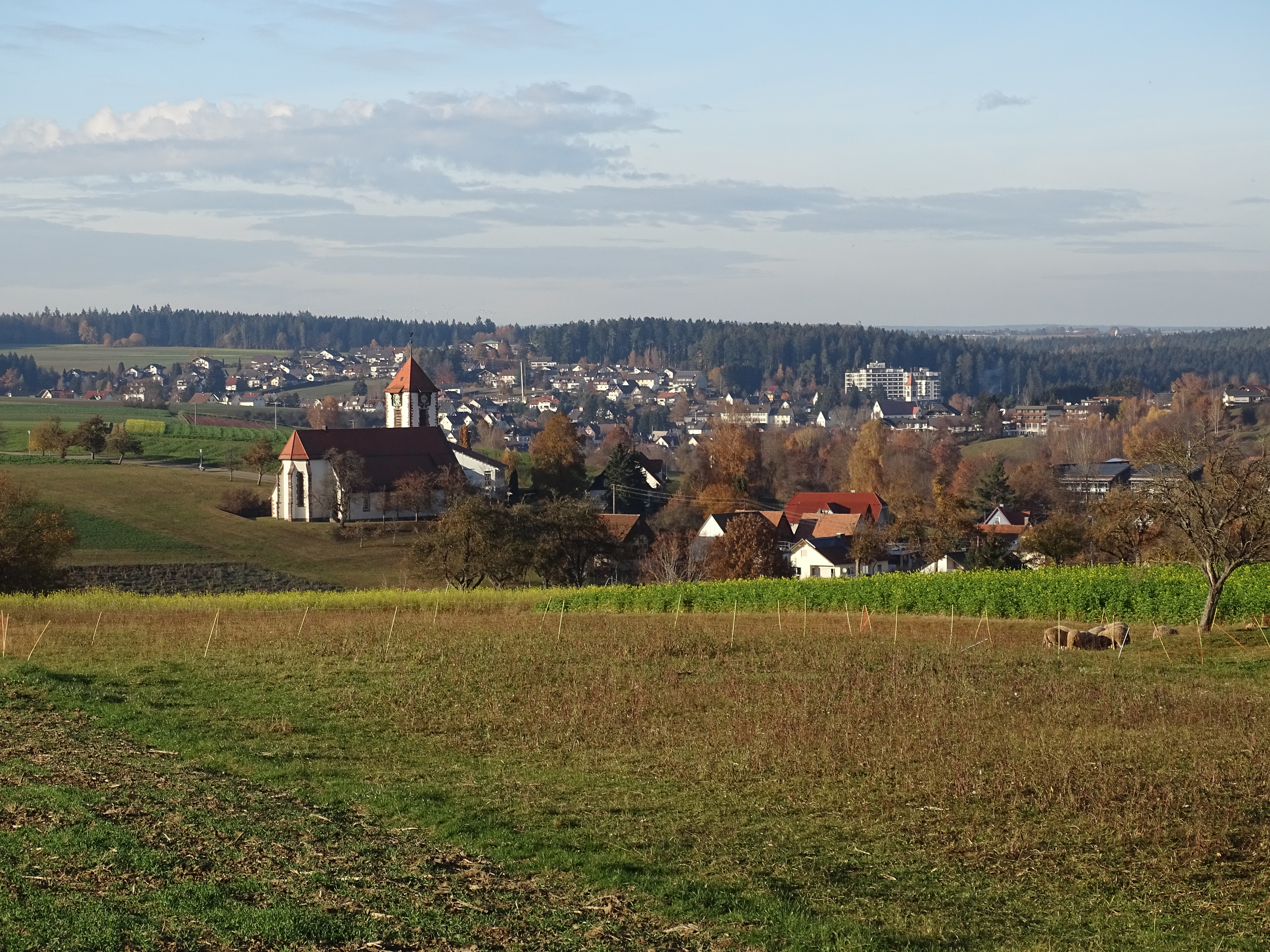
Tumlingen, one of the five villages in Waldachtal.

Waldachtal is a municipality in the district of Freudenstadt in Baden-Württemberg in the south-west of Germany. It consists of five villages that include some small settlements like farms and mills: Cresbach (932 inhabitants in December 31 of 2016), Hörschweiler (646), Lützenhardt (1597), Salzstetten (1783), Tumlingen (1012).

This municipality is rural, tourism is a very minor business, despite its placement in a beautiful landscape in the Black Forest and near the city of Freudenstadt. The most important source of income is Fischerwerke GmbH, a manufacturer of wall plugs, fasteners, construction toys and technical products.

== People ==
- Artur Fischer (1919–2016), German inventor, founder of Fischerwerke
