= List of RF connector types =

The following is a list of radio frequency connector types.

== Standard types ==
=== Standard-sized ===
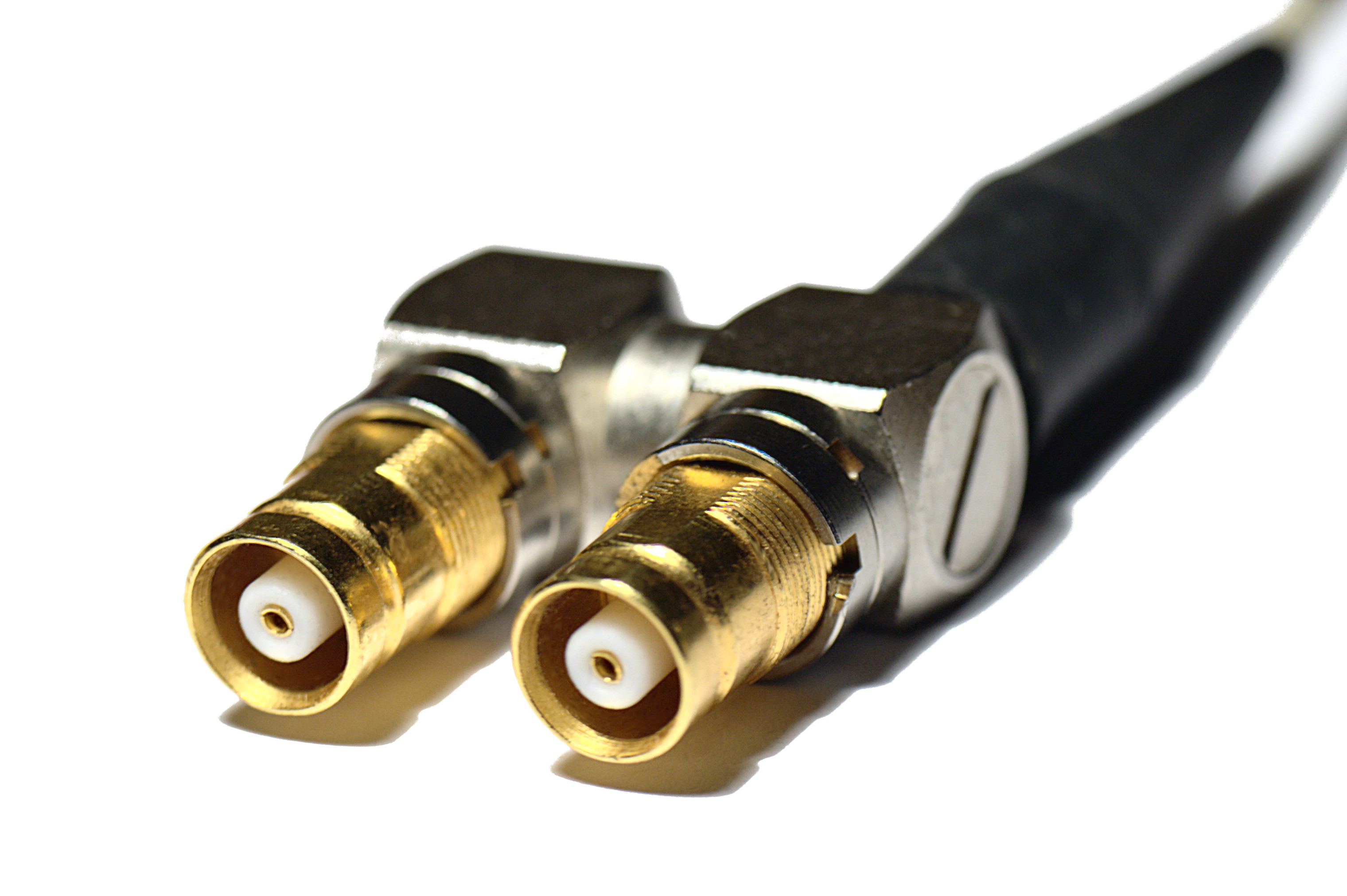
A double DIN 1.6/5.6 bulkhead jack connector, crimp type, for 75 Ω coaxial cable

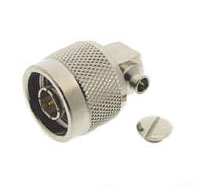
A Type N connector (male), right-angled solder-type for semi-rigid coaxial cable with a diameter of 0.141-inch

- 4.1-9.5 connector, standardized as DIN 47231 (in 1974) and IEC 60169-11 (in 1977)
- 4.3-10 connector, formerly known as DIN 4.3/10, now standardized as IEC 61169-54
- Belling-Lee connector, also called IEC 61169-2 connector, used throughout Europe and Australia, as well as parts of South-East Asia, for domestic television and FM radio antenna cabling
- BNC connector (Bayonet Neill-Concelman). (IEC 61169-8 and IEC 61169-63)
- C-type connector (Concelman)
- Dezifix connector, hermaphrodite connector used mainly by Rohde & Schwarz
- DIN 7/16 connector (DIN 47223 and IEC 61169-4), a high-power 50 Ω connector originally developed by Spinner
- F-type connector, used worldwide for domestic satellite LNBs (75 Ω) and some domestic television installations (with the exception of Europe and Australia)
- GR connector (officially the General Radio Type 874)
- LC/LT connector, a high voltage connector originally developed by the US Navy
- Motorola connector, standard AM/FM antenna connector used for automotive radios
- Musa connector, a 50 Ω connector used in telecommunications and broadcast video
- N connector "Type N" (Neill) 50 Ω or 75 Ω characteristic impedance connector (IEC 61169-16)
- NMD connector, standing for Network Measurements Division, are usually available as 3.5 mm, 2.9 mm, 2.4 mm, and 1.85 mm connectors. They are ruggedized test-port connectors used on test sets and network analyzers. NMD connectors have a large threaded body that has been specially designed to stabilize the test port cable when attached to the front of the test set or VNA.
- NMO mount connector (new Motorola mount), removable mobile antenna connector uses a 3/4 inch (19 mm) mounting hole and has a large base with a 1 1/8" – 18 tpi thread for attaching the antenna.
- SC connector, screw version of C connector [not to be confused with the fiber optic connector of the same name]
- SR connector (from Russian: Cоединитель Pадиочастотный) is a Russian RF connector, based on the BNC connector and which comes in a 50 Ω and 75 Ω versions
- TNC connector (threaded Neill-Concelman)
- Twin-BNC (Twinax) Twinax connectors are used with 78 Ω or 95 Ω conductor cables and operate from 0–200 MHz. Due to improved shielding characteristics, these connectors are used in balanced low level and high sensitivity circuits. They feature keyway polarization to ensure system integrity and prevent signals from being mixed, making them ideal for computer network applications. Other popular applications include broadband, military and instrumentation. The 2 stud bayonet clamp design allows quick and easy coupling without requiring special tools.
- UHF connector (e.g., PL-259/SO-239). Some Japanese manufacturers such as Diamond Antennas use an M-type clone which has the measures and thread translated to metric.

=== Miniature-sized ===
- AFI connector
- DIN 1.0/2.3 (DIN 47297), used for miniaturized 50 and 75 Ω coaxial modules in data- and telecommunications equipment which can have a threaded, or a push-pull lock coupling mechanism.
- DIN 1.6/5.6 (DIN 47295), a 75 Ω connector, used for similar purposes as DIN 1.0/2.3
- FME connector
- G-type connector
- HD-BNC connector
- HSD connector, circular connector (not coaxial) used in the automotive industry
- LEMO 00 connector, a proprietary push-pull 50 Ω coaxial connector
- MCX connector
- Microdot S-50 series connector, a proprietary 50 Ω coaxial connector
- Mini-BNC connector
- Belling Lee – Miniature Coax - L1465 Series, small & robust and incorporate an external circlip for retention. Used in the RML-380Z for internal video connection.
- Mini-UHF connector, a smaller and much newer design than the standard UHF
- SMA connector A 50 ohm screwed connection. The 0.9mm centre pin is the same diameter as the centre of RG402 Coax so that connections to that cable can be made with no discontinuity, forming the pin from the coax itself. Good to 18 GHz
  - RP-SMA connector, used in SOHO wireless networks and similar ISM band devices.
- Air cored Microwave connectors The name of a connector (e.g. 1.85) is determined by the diameter in mm of the air dielectric around the centre pin
  - 3.5 and 2.92 mm (sometimes called K) connectors, which also have a 0.9mm centre pin and cross-mate with SMA and offer higher maximum frequency
  - 2.4, 1.85 (sometimes called V) externally similar to SMA but have metric threads and a smaller pin, and do not cross-mate with SMA. The 0.5mm centre pin is the same diameter as the centre of RG405 Coax so that connections can be made with no discontinuity, forming the pin from the coax itself.
  - 1.35 mm connectors, for applications up to 90 GHz
  - 1.0 mm (sometimes called W) connectors, for applications up to 110 GHz
  - 0.8 mm connectors, for applications up to 145 GHz
  - 0.5 mm connectors, for applications up to 250 GHz
- SMB connector
  - FAKRA connector is a modified SMB connector with a keyed and colour coded plastic housing and latch, used in the automotive industry
- SMC connector
- SSMA connector is a 50 Ohm nominal impedance RF connector which utilizes a 10–36 threaded coupling and is essentially a scaled down version of the SMA. They are characterized by compactness, high frequency bandwidth, and highly reliable mechanical performance. The male contact was designed to be the same size as the cable conductor so that it could be used as the mating pin for optimized VSWR. Common applications included Mil-Aero, telecommunications, RFID, antennas, test and measurement and radar systems.
- SMZ connector – System 43 (BT43 and High Density HD43) for use in DDF. This is a 75 ohm impedance RF connector, and is ideal for instrumentation applications.

=== Micro-sized ===
- HFM connector (High-Speed FAKRA-Mini), used in the automotive industry
- Hirose U.FL connector; aka Amphenol AMC, I-PEX MHF I, UMCC, Sunridge MCB
- Hirose W.FL connector; aka Amphenol AMMC, I-PEX MHF3, Sunridge MCD
- I-PEX MHF 4 connector; aka Murata HSC
- IMP connector
- Mini-SMB connector This is a 75 Ohm RF connector which provides broadband capability through 2 GHz. Its snap-on design offers a quick connect/disconnect. It features a reduced housing allowing circuit miniaturization and efficient use of space. They are available for several cable types as well as for PCB through hole, surface mount and end launch applications from several manufacturers, including Amphenol RF.
- MMCX connector (IEC 61169-52) MMCX (Micro-Miniature Coaxial) is one of the smallest RF connectors in common use, featuring a snap-lock mechanism rated to 6 GHz. Its tiny size makes it essential for embedded WiFi and Bluetooth modules, wearable devices, hearing aids, and any RF assembly where board space is extremely constrained. It is the standard interface on most M.2 WiFi cards.
- MMS connector
- MMT connector
- PSMP connector
- SSMB connector This is a 50 Ohm connector which is a small version of the standard SMB connector. They provide excellent electrical performance in a micro miniature footprint. The snap-on mating interface allows quick installation and dense packaging. Common applications include military, instrumentation, PC/LAN and wireless.
- SSMC connector Are ideal for limited-space applications that require the security of a threaded coupling mechanism. They are best used with semi-rigid cables or miniature flexible cables in demanding applications up to 12.4 GHz
- UMP connector

== Precision types ==
- APC-7 connector

== Flanged types ==
- EIA RF Connectors series of flanged connectors, normally used in high power broadcast transmission sites with rigid lines

== Quick-lock types ==
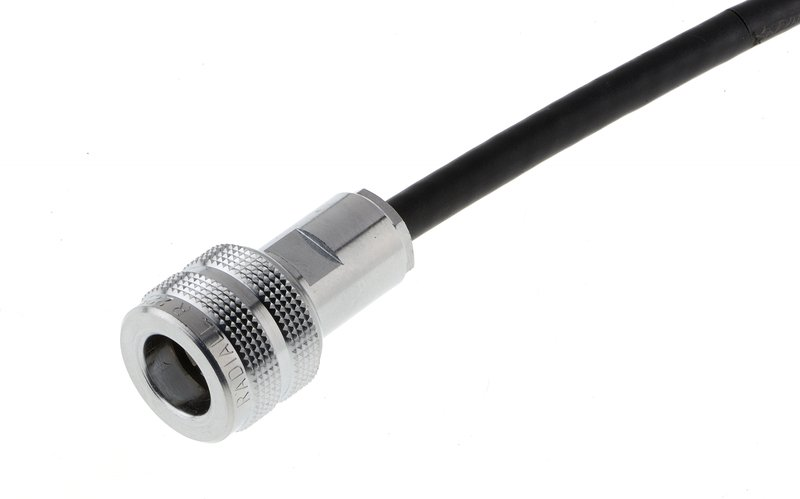
A Mini Quick connector, a Quick-lock type connector for coaxial cable

- HPQN connector
- Mini Quick connector
- QLS connector
- QMA and QN connector
  - Mini-QMA connector
  - WQMA connector (Waterproof QMA)
- SnapN connector

== High-voltage types ==
- HN connector, a high voltage version of the N connector
- MHV connector, a coaxial connector designed for high voltages
- SHV connector, a safer coaxial connector designed for high voltages

== Blind-mate types ==
- BMA (OSP) connector
- BMMA (OSSP) connector
- BMZ connector
- BZ connector
- SMP (GPO) connector
- SMPM (GPPO) connector
- SMPS (G3PO) connector

== Audio and video types ==
The following audio and video connectors are sometimes used for RF, but are not generally considered to be RF connectors:

- Concentric twinax connector
- DIN connector (not to be confused with "7/16 DIN" or "DIN 1.0/2.3" connectors)
- Multimedia extension connectors (MXC) are based on the 8-pin Mini-DIN connector
- RCA connector (Radio Corporation of America, also "Cinch connector") was originally introduced for audio, but is now widely used for video as well
- SCART

== See also ==
- RF connector
- Category:Coaxial connectors
- Flanged connector
- Optical fiber connector
