= 4.3-10 connector =

Multi-purpose RF connector

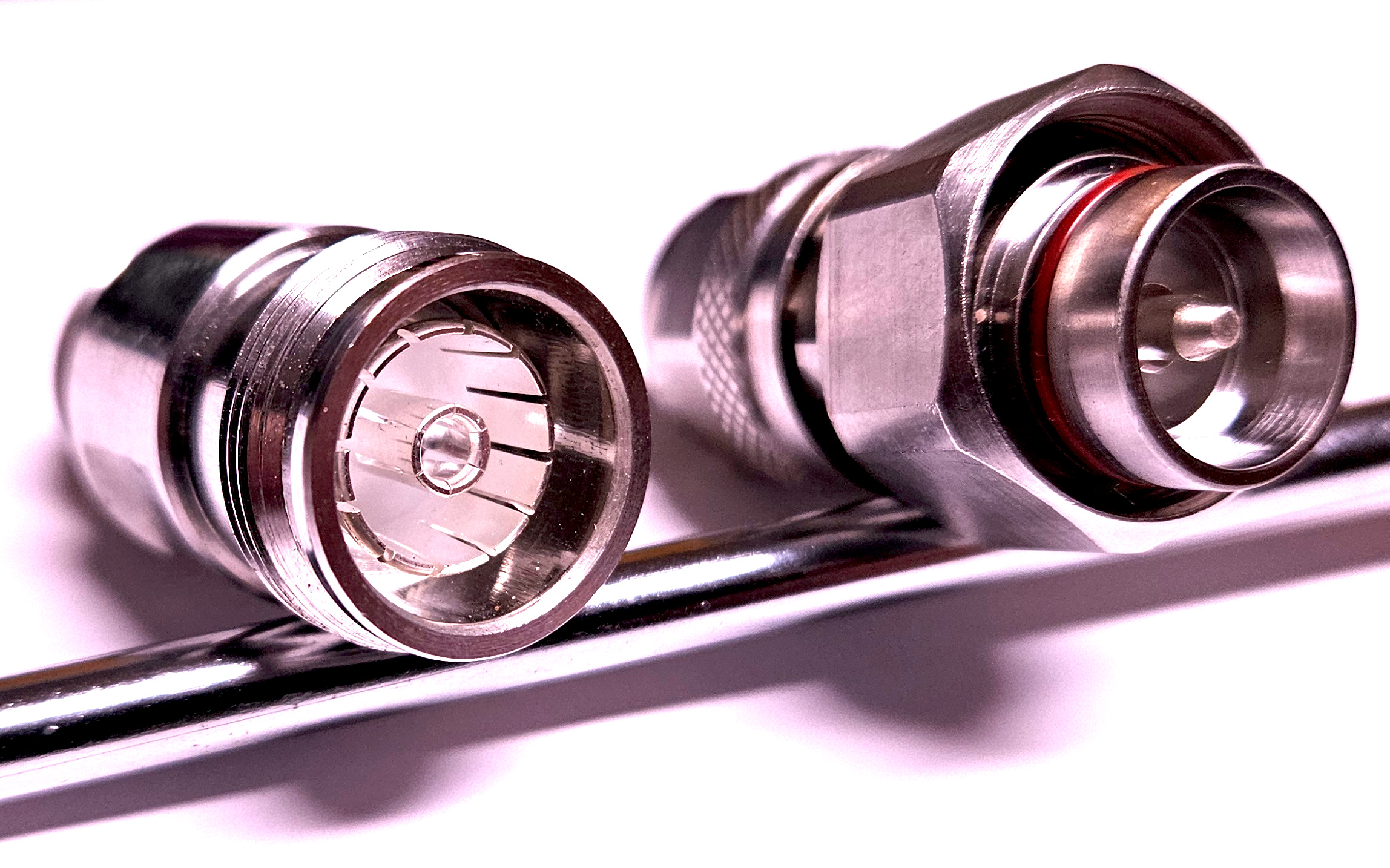
- Female (left) and Male (right) 4.3-10 adapters
- Type: RF coaxial connector

Production history
- Designer: Huber+Suhner, Spinner, Rosenberger & Telegärtner
- Designed: 2013
- Manufacturer: Various

General specifications
- Diameter: 10 mm outer conductor, 4.35 mm inner conductor
- Cable: Coaxial
- Passband: DC - 6 GHz (12 GHz)

Electrical
- Max. voltage: 500 V RMS

The 4.3-10 connector (sometimes referred to as 4.3/10) is a 50 Ω multi-purpose RF connector used to connect coaxial cables with other cables or RF devices, such as transmitters or antennas. The IEC standard 61169-54 specifies the inner diameter of the outer conductor as 10 mm and the outer diameter of the inner conductor as 4.35 mm, from which the name derives.

It was developed by a group of RF connector manufacturers, Huber+Suhner, Spinner (Unternehmen), Rosenberger Hochfrequenztechnik and Telegärtner, to replace the industry standard connector in cellular networks, the 7/16 DIN connector.

It is not to be confused with the similar-looking DIN 4.1/9.5 connector, which is very close in dimensions, but mechanically incompatible and could lead to damage on either end when connected.

== Design ==
The main design criteria were to improve upon 7/16 DIN by offering several advantages:

- smaller footprint
- reduced torque requirements
- improved passive intermodulation performance
- universal support for hex-wrench, hand-tighten and quick-release couplings

The footprint was decreased by reducing the outer conductor diameter from 16 to 10 mm, which lowers the power rating, but allows a connection density of 1 connector per inch (2.54 cm), in line with other connectors such as DIN 4.1/9.5 or N connectors.

The high torque requirements of 25-30 Nm for DIN 7/16 could be overcome by a significantly different design, decoupling the electrical contact from the mechanical fastening interface. While 7/16 uses an axial O-ring gasket, which needs to be compressed by applying high torque to the coupling nut to make reliable electrical contact between the outer and inner conductors, 4.3-10 uses a radially loaded O-ring, set into a groove in the outer conductor of the male plug. This removes the dependence on axial force (coupling torque) and relies solely on the low insertion force to seal. However, it also increases the stress on the much smaller gasket, which can be more easily damaged. Nevertheless, it significantly reduces installation-related PIM issues, since the electrical connection is identical at hand-tight or the commonly specified 5 Nm coupling torque.

Lastly, the same socket can be used for the 3 common connector types:

- 22 mm hex-nut
- (Knurled) hand-screw nut
- push-pull-type quick release

This is achieved by an integrated groove in all female 4.3-10 sockets, in addition to the thread.

== Performance ==
4.3-10 was designed for cellular network sites and the electrical performance is optimized for this use-case. It features a frequency range from DC to 6 GHz, though variants specified for up to 12 GHz are common. Their impedance is 50 Ohm, and currently no other impedance variants are available. At least 100 mating cycles are specified. The return loss at 6 GHz is at least 32 dB (and higher at lower frequencies).

Due to the smaller conductors, the power rating is generally lower than DIN 7/16. Most manufacturers rate their 4.3-10 connectors for 500 Watt at 2 GHz and 700 Watt at 1 GHz.

The third order intermodulation performance is usually at around -166 dBc at 2 * 43 dBm but may vary slightly between manufacturers.

== Standardization and adoption ==
The 4.3-10 interface has been standardized in 2016 by the IEC as IEC 61169-54, with an update in 2021 as IEC 61169-54:2021.

Even during standardization it was quickly adopted by the major telecommunication equipment vendors, among them Commscope, Ericsson, Huawei, and Nokia Networks.

By now it has replaced 7/16 in basically all mobile network base-station equipment at frequencies below 6 GHz.

== See also ==
- List of RF connector types
  - N connector
  - BNC connector
  - TNC connector
- EEG DIN connector
