= Motorola connector =

Common coaxial cable RF connector in the automotive industry

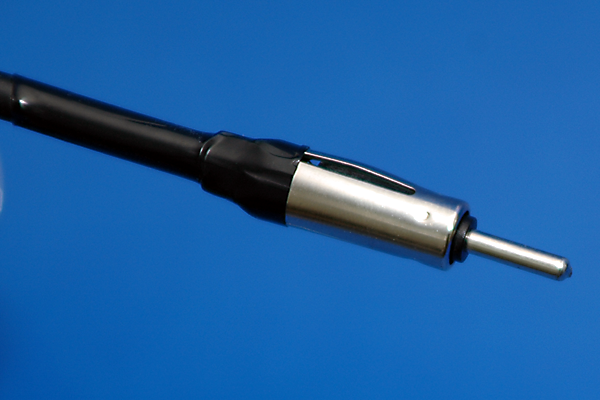
- Typical Motorola plug found on consumer auto accessory antenna coaxial cables. Note the spring section on the top of the shield connector.
- Type: RF coaxial connector

General specifications
- Diameter: 0.365 in (0.93 cm) barrel
- Cable: Coaxial

A Motorola connector (also called a Motorola antenna plug or a male DIN 41585) is a common coaxial cable RF connector used primarily in the automotive industry for connecting the coaxial feedline from the antenna to the radio receiver. It is also sometimes used for connecting scanner antennas to scanners. The male plug somewhat resembles an RCA connector in size and shape, but instead of surrounding the pin, the sleeve is "folded" back over the coax.

The pin is usually soldered to the center conductor of the coaxial cable coming from the antenna, although solderless versions exist with a screw against the centre connector. The grounded side forms a 3.5 cm (1.5 in) long sleeve around the coax. The sleeve usually contains one or more longitudinal spring surfaces, which provide reliable electrical contact by wiping against the mating female socket.

== See also ==
- RCA connector
- TV aerial plug
- F connector
