= 7/16 DIN connector =

7-16 DIN connector
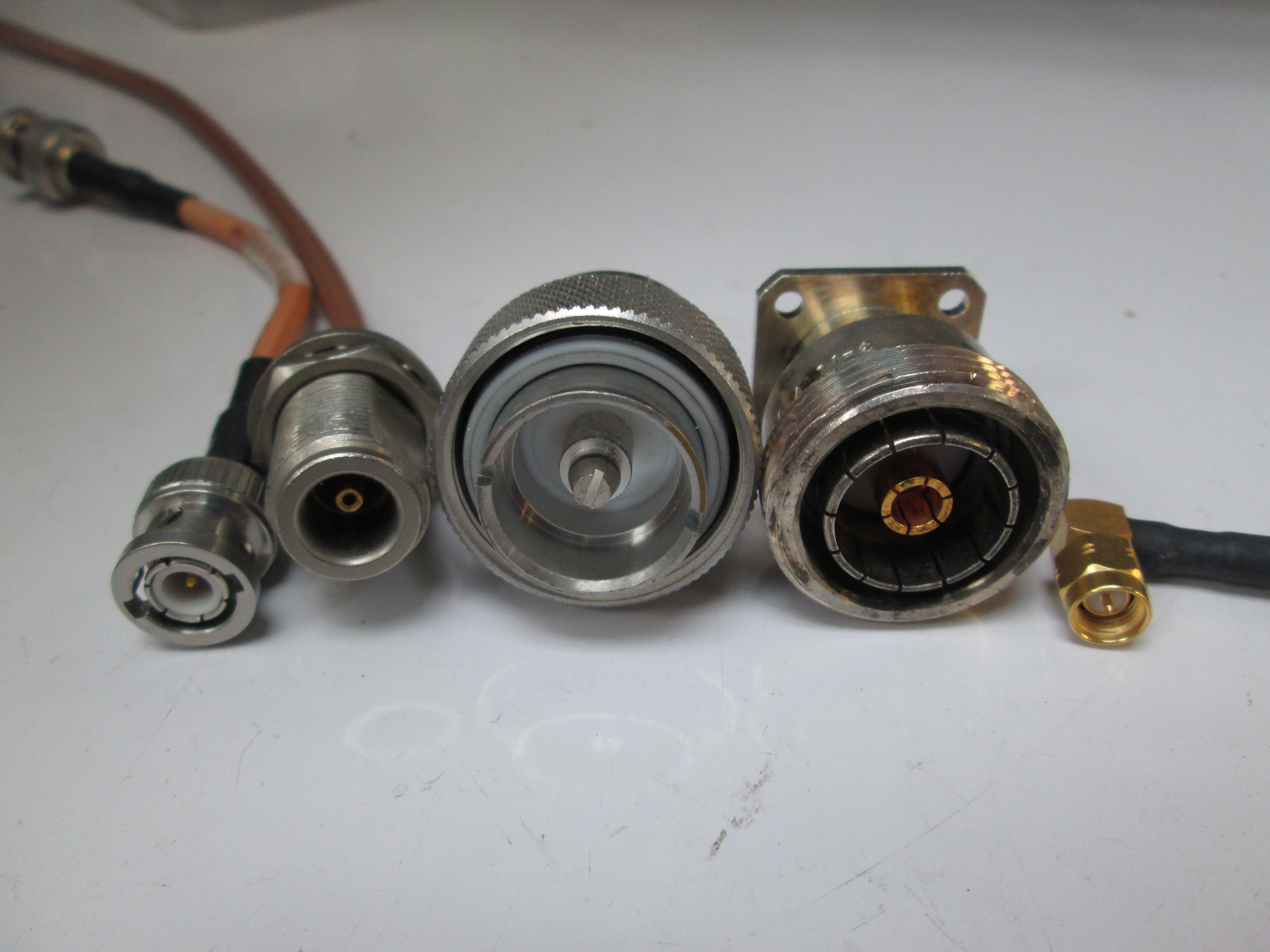
- The 7-16 DIN connector pictured with some other (smaller) common RF connectors. Left to right: BNC male, N female, 7-16 DIN male, 7-16 DIN female, SMA male
- Type: RF coaxial connector
- Cable: Coaxial

The 7-16 DIN connector or 7/16 (seven and sixteen millimeter DIN) is a 50 Ω threaded RF connector used to join coaxial cables. It was designed to reduce passive intermodulation from multiple transmitters. It is among the most widely used high power RF connectors in cellular network antenna systems. Originally popular in Europe, it has gained widespread use in the US and elsewhere.

It is not to be confused with the similar-sounding EIA flanged RF connectors which are referred to by the outer diameter in fractions of an inch.

The 7–16 DIN connector is also defined by an international standard, IEC 61169-4. It out-performs other non-flange options, such as N connectors or BNC connectors, when it comes to interference and intermodulation rejection or higher power handling at RF frequencies.

The inner contact on the 7-16 DIN connector measures 7 mm in outer diameter while the outer contact on the connector measures 16 mm. in inner diameter DIN is an acronym for the Deutsches Institut für Normung, the standards organization that harmonized the standard for the connector. (Previously the 7-16 had been developed as a military 'special' and made by Spinner and others.) The external thread is 29 mm, 1.5 mm pitch.

As with all RF connectors the safe power handling limit is determined by the heating and subsequent oxidation of the centre 'pin' for continuous operation at high frequencies, and by voltage breakdown between inner and outer conductors at lower frequencies or short pulse operation. For reliable high power operation, connectors must be assembled with careful attention to cleanliness and alignment. In practice the power handling curve is a complex function of frequency, and extrapolating from spot frequency figures can be misleading.

There are larger connectors in the same family; the 13-30 DIN (external thread 50 mm, 3 mm pitch) and the (rare) 25-58 DIN that permit progressively higher power handling (approximately twice and four times, respectively). As the cables to fit these connectors are rare, neither connector has gained the near-universal popularity of the 7-16 DIN and these connectors remain unseen outside the domain of a few specialty broadcast equipment manufacturers.

== Usage ==
According to the Utilities Telecom Council journal,

7/16 DIN connectors are used in antenna systems where there are multiple transmitters using the same antenna or where a base station antenna is co-located with a large number of other transmitting antennas... These connectors produce lower inter-modulation distortion products and thus are specified at busy RF sites and in almost all trunking systems where multiple transmitters share a common antenna. Note that an antenna rated for low passive inter-modulation (PIM) performance must be used along with these connectors. It defeats the purpose of designing a low PIM antenna system if regular N connectors or a non-PIM rated antenna are used.

== See also ==
- List of RF connector types
  - N connector
  - BNC connector
  - TNC connector
- EEG DIN connector
