= MXC =

MXC or mxc may refer to:

- Manyika dialect (ISO 639:mxc)
- Mexico City, the capital of Mexico
- Mexicargo (ICAO: MXC)
- Monticello Airport (Utah) (IATA: MXC)
- Most Extreme Elimination Challenge, an American TV program
- Multimedia extension connector, a video connector
- The year 1090
