= QN =

QN or qn may refer to:

- Q_{n}, one of several robust measures of scale in statistics
- ATCvet code QN Nervous system, a section of the Anatomical Therapeutic Chemical Classification System for veterinary medicinal products
- QN connector, a type of coaxial RF connector
- Queen's Nurse (QN), an honorary title awarded by the Queen's Nursing Institute (QNI) to community nurses
- Queen regnant (Qn.), in the Christian Church, following the name of a Christian saint who was a Queen
- Queer Nation (QN), a United States LGBT social movement
- Quintillion (qn), a large number
- Quotidiano Nazionale, an Italian online newspaper
