= QLS =

QLS may refer to:

- QLS connector
- Dynamic light scattering, also known as quasi-elastic light scattering, a technique in physics
- Quantum logic spectroscopy, an ion control scheme
- Questlove Supreme, podcast
