= Microdot (disambiguation) =

A microdot is reduced size text or photographic images, compulsory for the identification of cars in South Africa.

Microdot may also refer to:

- Microdot (car), a concept hybrid city car designed by William Towns in 1976
- Microdot (connector), a series of connectors by Tyco Electronics
- Microdot (rapper), a South Korean rapper
- Microdot, a graphic design company founded by Brian Cannon
- A street name for LSD in pill form
- Printer steganography, a way of encoding printer serial numbers and timestamps
