= F lead =

F lead may refer to:

- F lead (pencil), a classification of pencil
- F connector, used for satellite television
