= DIN connector =

Electrical connector

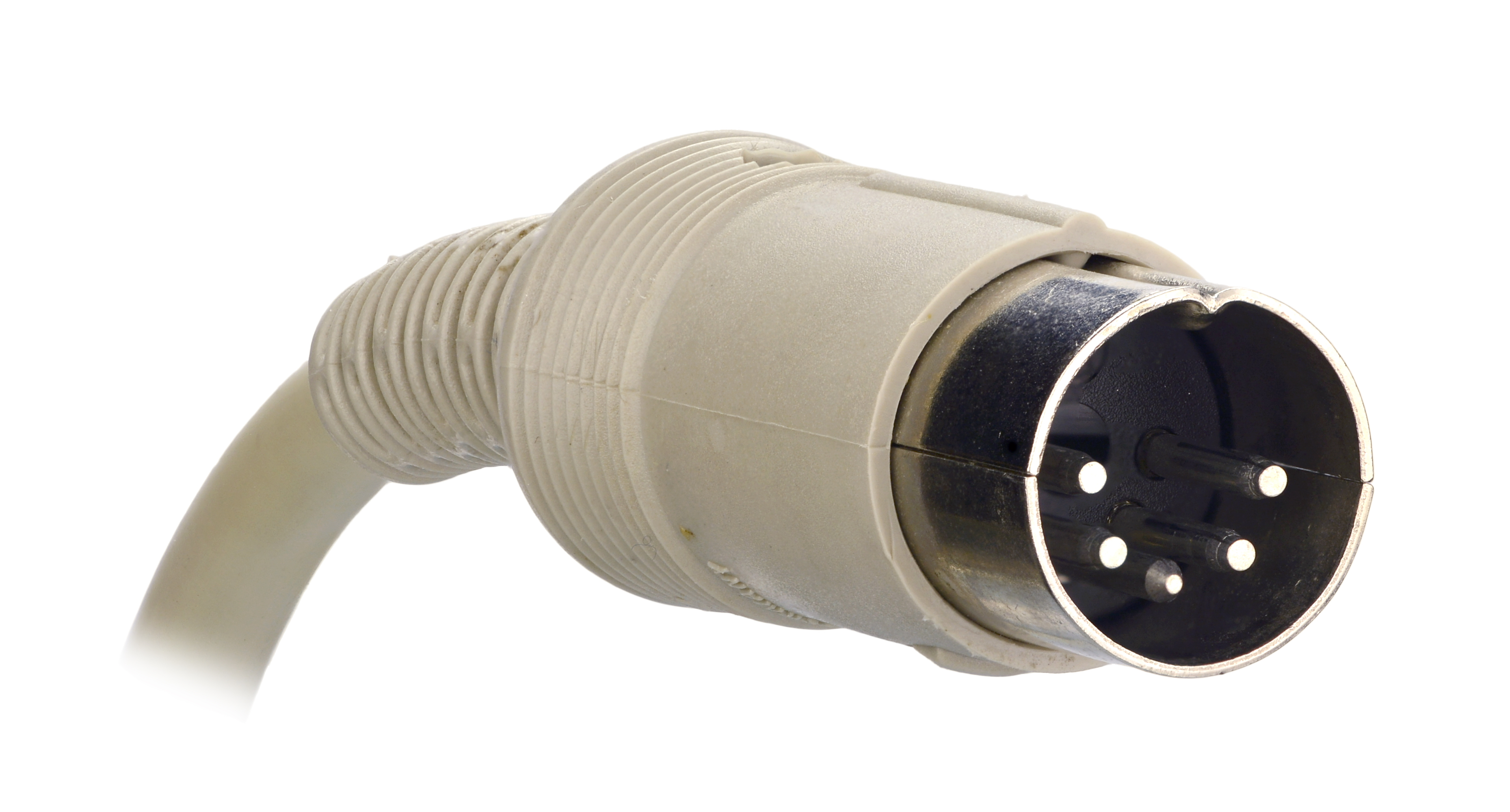
Five-pin male 180° DIN connector from a 1988 Schneider MF2 keyboard by Cherry

The DIN connector is an electrical signal connector that was standardized by the Deutsches Institut für Normung (DIN), the German Institute for Standards, in the mid 1950s, initially with three pins for mono, but when stereo connections and gear appeared in the late 1950s, versions with five pins or more were made. The male DIN connectors (plugs) feature a 13.2 mm diameter metal shield with a notch that sets the orientation in which plug and socket can mate. The range of DIN connectors, different only in the configuration of the pins, has been standardized as DIN 41524 / IEC/DIN EN 60130-9 (3-pin at 90° and 5-pin at 45°); DIN 45322 (5-pin and 6-pin at 60°); DIN 45329 / IEC/DIN EN 60130–9 (7-pin at 45°); and DIN 45326 / IEC/DIN EN 60130-9 (8-pin at 45°).

In consumer electronics, the cylindrical connectors were adopted for analog audio signals. Some DIN connectors have been used in analog video applications, for power connections, and for digital interfaces, such as the MIDI (DIN 41524), the IBM PC keyboard and the IBM AT keyboard connectors (DIN 41524). The original, technical standards for these models of DIN connector are unavailable, and were replaced with equivalent connectors, such as the international standard IEC 60130-9.

== Standards ==
The term "DIN connector" alone does not unambiguously identify any particular type of connector unless the document number of the relevant DIN standard is added (e.g., "DIN 45322 connector"). Some DIN connector standards are:

- DIN 41524, for circular connectors often used for audio signals or some digital signals like MIDI
- DIN 41612, rectangular connectors used to connect plug-in cards to a back plane or motherboard
- DIN 41652, D-subminiature connectors used for computer data and video
- DIN 41585, automotive coaxial connectors

== Circular connectors ==
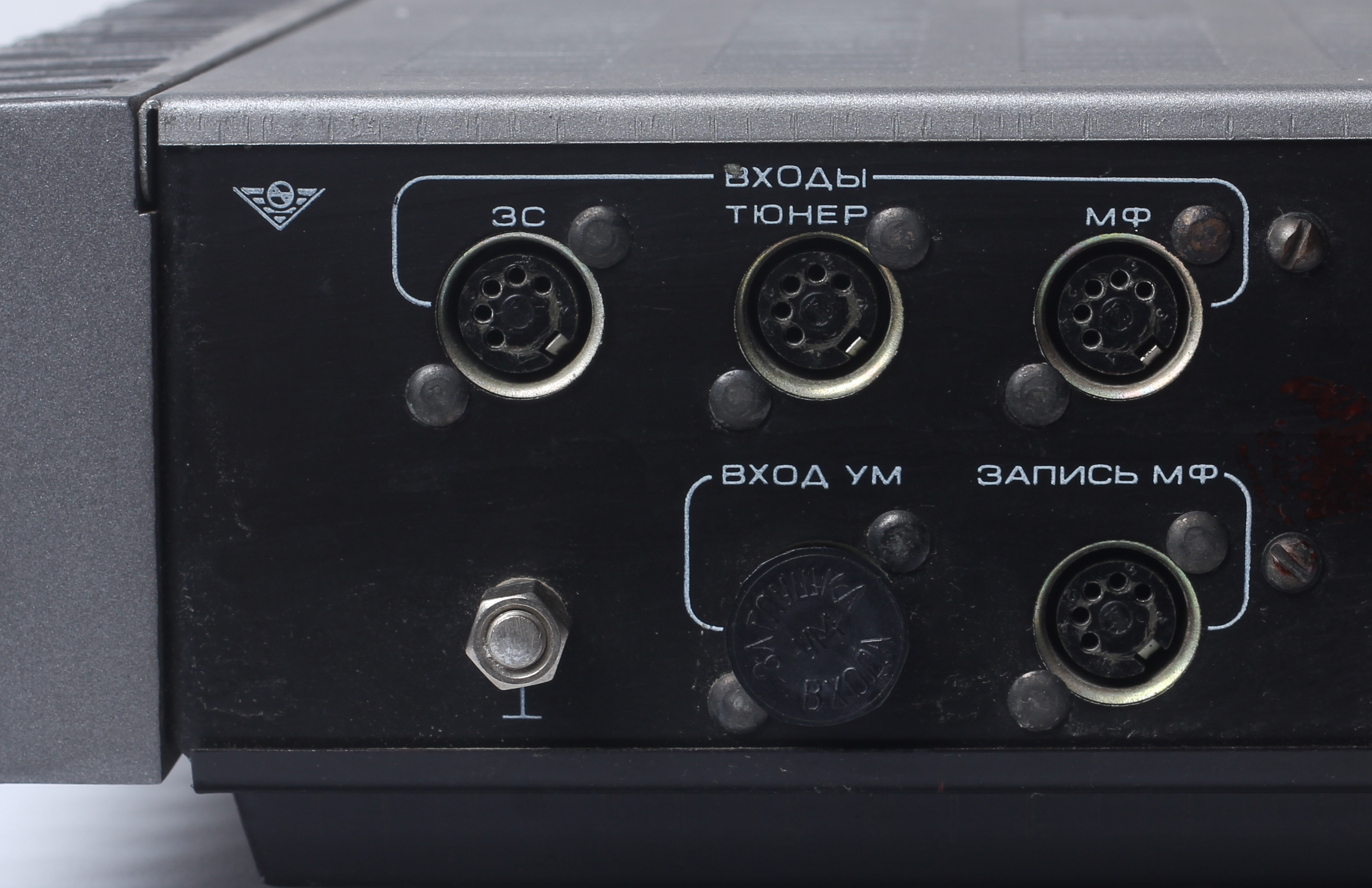
Circular connectors

DIN 41524 / IEC/DIN EN 60130-9 types IEC-01 and IEC-02: three-pin, 90°, 180°

IEC/DIN EN 60130-9 types IEC-30 and IEC-31: four-pin, 72°, 216°

DIN 45327 / IEC/DIN EN 60130-9 types IEC-14, IEC-15, and IEC-15a: five-pin, 90°, cube, domino, 270°/360°

DIN 45322: five-pin, 60°, 240°

DIN 41524 / IEC/DIN EN 60130-9 types IEC-03 and IEC-04: five-pin, 45°, 180°

DIN 45322 / IEC/DIN EN 60130-9 types IEC-16, IEC-17, IEC-18, and IEC-19: six-pin, 60°, 240°

DIN 45329 / IEC/DIN EN 60130-9 types IEC-10, IEC-11, IEC-12, and IEC-13: seven-pin, 45°, 270°

DIN 45326 / IEC/DIN EN 60130-9 types IEC-20 and IEC-21: eight-pin, 45°, 270°

DIN IEC 60574-18: eight-pin, 45°/41°, 262°

The plugs consist of a circular shielding metal skirt protecting a number of straight round pins. The pins are 1.45 mm in diameter and equally spaced (at 90°, 72°, 60° or 45° angles) in a 7.0 mm diameter circle. The skirt is keyed to ensure that the plug is inserted with the correct orientation, and to prevent damage to the pins. The basic design also ensures that the shielding is connected between socket and plug prior to any signal path connection being made.

There are seven common patterns, with any number of pins from three to eight. Three different five-pin connectors exist, known as 180°, 240°, and domino/360°/270° after the angle of the arc swept between the first and last pin. There are also two variations of the six-pin, seven-pin (one where the outer pins form 300° or 360° and one where they form 270°), and eight-pin (one where the outer pins form 270° and one where they form 262°) connectors.

There is some limited compatibility; for example, a three-pin connector will fit any 180° five-pin socket, engaging three of the pins and leaving the other two unconnected; and a three-pin or 180° five-pin connector will also fit a 270° seven-pin or either eight-pin socket.

In addition to these connectors, there are also connectors with 10, 12, and 14 pins. Some high-specification equipment used seven-pin connectors where the outer two carried digital system data; if the connected equipment was incompatible, the outer two pins could be unscrewed from the plugs so that they fitted into standard five-pin 180° sockets without data connections.

As the keying is consistent across all connectors, it does not completely prevent incompatible connectors from mating, which can lead to damage; this is changed in Mini-DIN, which keys different connectors.

Some "domino" five-pin connectors had a keyway on opposing sides of the socket, allowing it to be reversed. If used as a headphone connector, the plug sometimes had a cut-out in the body that, depending on which way the plug was inserted, would either allow (e.g.) external speakers to be switched off or not as required: inserting the plug one way would activate a switch on the periphery of the socket (thus switching off the speakers), whereas inserting the plug in the opposite orientation would not activate the switch (due to the cut-out in the plug body)—the left and right channels would not be transposed, as the plug was wired such that each headphone or speaker was connected "top left–bottom right" and "top right–bottom left". Note that when rotating a DIN headphone connector 180 degrees the polarity will be reversed. This generally doesn't affect the audio but if an adapter with a DIN headphone male connector and most other types of female headphone connector is used, the negative connection for both channels will be joined resulting in the audio being stereo with the DIN connector inserted one way and mono when inserted the other way. To avoid this and still be able to use a pair of headphones both with equipment that has a DIN headphone connector and also use it with other equipment, it is suggested to permanently mount a DIN connector on the headphones and make an adapter to use other devices with headphones that has a DIN connector. If used as a serial data connection, the transmit and receive lines could be crossed (although the pinout adopted by Acorn did not allow for this).

Screw-locking versions of this connector have also been used in instrumentation, process control, and professional audio. In North America, this variant is often called a "small Tuchel" connector after one of the major manufacturers, now a division of Amphenol. Additional configurations up to 24 pins are also offered in the same shell size. A version with a bayonet locking ring was used on portable tape recorders, dictation machines, and lighting dimmers and controls through from the 1960s to the 1980s, an example being the microphone input connector and some others on the "Report" family of Uher tape recorders. The bayonet locking version is sometimes referred to by the trade name Preh. Belling Lee offered a version with a sprung-loaded collar which latched on insertion but required the collar to be pulled back to release the connector, similar to the LEMO B series connector. This connector was commonly referred to as the "Bleecon", an example of its use being the Strand Tempus range of theatrical lighting dimmers and control desks. A version with a pushbutton latch similar to that on an XLR cable mounted socket was also available. Female connectors with screw-locking, Bleecon, or bayonet latching features are compatible with standard DIN plugs.

DIN Connectors with correct pin-out

== Applications ==
=== Analog audio ===
Application		Connector	Pin function				
Application		Connector	1	4	2	5	3
Amplifier	Monophonic	5/180°	Audio out		Screen/return	Audio in	
Amplifier	Stereophonic	5/180°	Left out	Right out	Screen/return	Right in	Left in
Tape recorder	Monophonic	5/180°	Audio in		Screen/return	Audio out	
Tape recorder	Stereophonic	5/180°	Left in	Right in	Screen/return	Right out	Left out
Common colors on DIN-4*RCA adapters			white	red	Screen/return	yellow	black
Common colors on DIN-2*RCA adapters					Screen/return	red	white

The 3/180° and 5/180° connectors were originally standardized and widely used in European countries for interconnecting analog audio equipment. For example, a stereo tape recorder could connect to a stereo amplifier using the five pins for the four signal connections plus ground. The connectors on the cord are connected pin for pin, (pin 1 to pin 1, etc.). Pins on male connectors are numbered (from right to left, viewed from outside of the connector, with the five pins upwards, and facing them): 1–4–2–5–3. Holes on female connectors are also numbered 1-4-2-5-3, but from left to right (facing the holes). The three pins that make contact with a three-pin DIN connector will have the same pin numbering both in the three-pin and the five-pin connector. A four-conductor cord wired in this way is sometimes called a DIN cord, a DIN lead or a DIN cable. For mono interconnections, the 3/180° plugs are sufficient. When a mono plug is inserted into a stereo socket, it mates with the left channel. For playback-only interconnections, the 3/180° plugs are sufficient, with pin 1 and 3 used for the stereo channels and pin 2 as signal ground. Five-pin DIN inputs for record players and auxiliary signal sources commonly join pin 1 and 5 in order to be compatible both with the 3/180° and 5/180° pinouts. This generally works, but the join of pin 1 and 5 on adapters between DIN and RCA connectors can cause problems if used with a five-pin DIN connector tape connector on an amplifier or receiver, as it will join the left record with the right playback signal. The other way around is usually not a problem, as sending the right playback out of a tape recorder back in to the left record input usually causes no trouble in playback mode.

The signal levels are generally in the low range of line levels for playback/reproduction signals. The levels for recording can be considerably lower, more like microphone levels in some cases.

Some manufacturers – Philips, Uher and others – used the connector slightly differently for tape recorders. Pin 2 (signal ground) was the same as others, and in playback mode pin 3 and 5 were used for left and right line level output, again as others. However, in record mode all pins were active inputs, with pins 1 and 4 for low-level signals while pins 3 and 5 were used for line-level signals. On these recorders, the output signals were only active in play mode, not in stop, record, rewind, fast forward or any other mode. The main benefit of this usage is that tape copying can be done with the regular pin-to-pin connected cables commonly used to connect tape recorders to amplifiers/receivers. An additional benefit is that several tape recorders can be connected in parallel, and can also be connected to an amplifier/receiver. Copying is done simply by pressing 'play' on the playback recorder, 'record' on any recorders used for recording, and the amplifier/receiver is either switched off or set to the tape position. Recording of radio broadcasts or records is equally simple: just press record on any recorder and do not set any other recorder to play back mode. This eliminates the need for the switch boxes otherwise commonly used to connect more than one tape recorder to a single tape recorder connector on an amplifier/receiver. The drawbacks were that connecting any mono recorder with pin 1 joined to 4 and pin 5 joined to 3 (a common practice to make mono recorders record both channels in parallel and reproduce in both channels) would make all tape sounds mono. Also any tape recorder with three heads, used for monitoring while recording, needs an extra lead between the recorder and the amplifier to be able to monitor the recording through the amplifier and speakers. On Philips amplifiers/receivers and three-head recorders that extra socket is labeled Monitor while the regular socket is labeled Tape. Another drawback is the possible confusion when interconnecting with other equipment, where a person sometimes would use a straight pin-to-pin cable and sometimes use a special "copying" cable with pin 1 swapped with pin 3 and pin 4 swapped with pin 5. Sometimes a person would also need to lower the signal to make a line output fit a microphone level input.

In other cases, the connector additionally sends power to a device. For example in tuners, only pins 1, 4 and 2 are required for the audio signal, and pins 3 and 5 could supply power to the tuner, which usually had low power requirements. This is compatible with other standard input connectors, but misusing pins 3 and 5 may cause damage. Other manufacturers used more than five pins, for example cassette decks with two other pins for power supply. Usually these were proprietary connections, making them compatible only with decks of the same manufacturer. Some manufacturers used more than five-pin connections (seven or even nine pins) for devices with remote control; besides the audio signals there was also a remote control link (usually the main unit with remote receiver being the amplifier/receiver). Also, some amplifiers and receivers with ceramic phono input used pins 1,4,2 for conventional line audio signal input and pins 3 and 5 for powering an optional external magnetic phono preamplifier. In this case, these manufacturers were also supplying the preamplifier. The input without preamplifier can be used as normal on pins 1, 2 and 4, but care should be taken to avoid shorting pins 3 and 5, which in this case are power supply, which may cause damage to equipment. In other cases, pins 1, 2 and 4 are used for a magnetic cartridge, and pins 3, 5 (with ground on pin 2 ) for ceramic. This depends on manufacturer. Other combinations for cassette decks were: input and output, power supply, remote control and record sync. This will usually work only with decks of the same manufacturer. Usually it will be compatible with conventional decks, but care must be taken not to short the other pins.

This interface was rare outside products for the European market, and from the 1980s progressively disappeared on new equipment, both in Europe and worldwide, in favour of RCA connectors. Non-European products intended for the European market commonly combined both DIN and RCA connectors, with cassette decks having both types and amplifiers/receivers commonly having RCA connectors for everything and an additional 5-pin DIN connector for at least one tape machine, usually in parallel with a set of RCA connectors for the same input/output.

=== Other uses ===
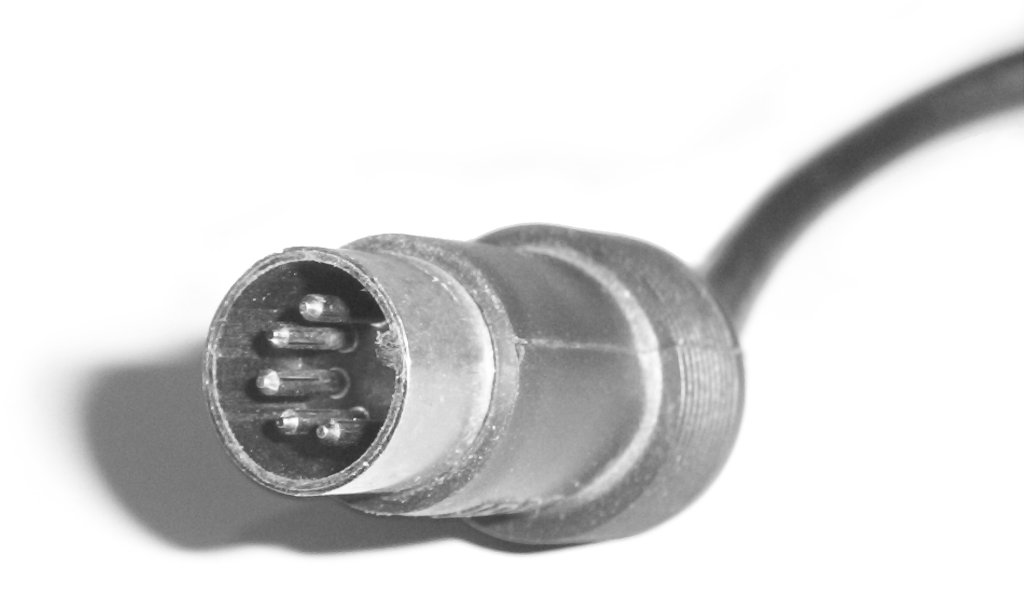
Five-pin male 180° DIN connector from the keyboard of an original IBM PC. Note the unusually thick shielding skirt.

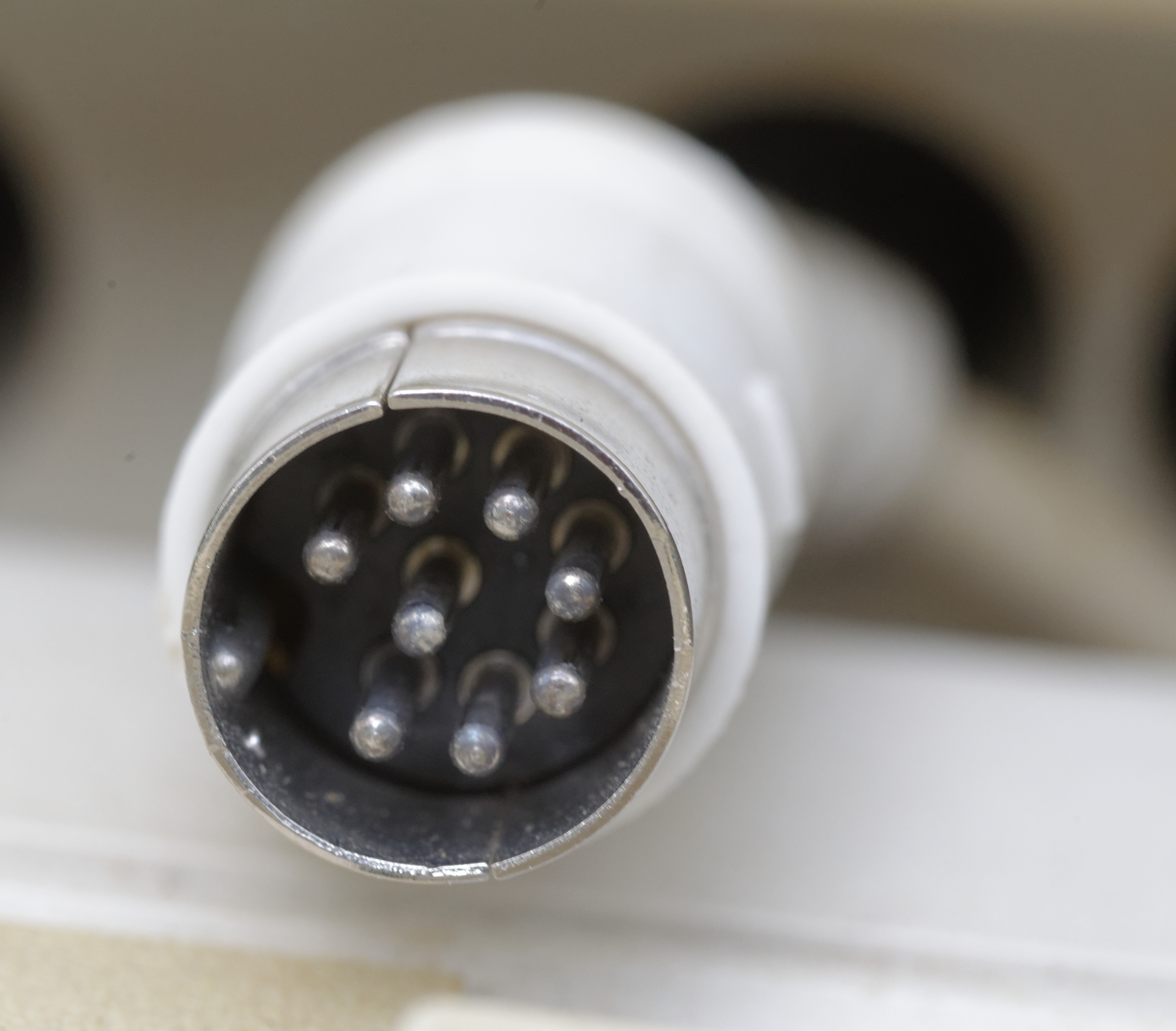
Eight-pin DIN connector for a Tandy 1000 keyboard

The 5/180° connectors are commonly used for:

- SYNC or MIDI for electronic musical instrument
- Peripherals or power connectors for personal computers from the 1980s
- Audio in the original HME wireless communicators (It is the headset connector for inbound and outbound audio for drive-through restaurants.)
- Controlling tilt of UMTS antennas (Antenna Interface Standards Group)
- Connecting two controllers for radio controlled model aircraft together for training purposes

The DIN connector saw several other uses apart from audio. It was particularly popular as a connector for various home computers and video game consoles.

Analogue theatrical lighting control (pre-dating the more recent digital control protocols such as DMX) commonly used the 8-pin (45°) DIN connector, six of the pins being 0–10 V control signals for six separate dimmer circuits, and the other two a 0 V reference and a DC source for powering simple circuitry in rudimentary lighting desks. Pinouts vary between manufacturers: Zero 88, Anytronics, Lightprocessor and Strand have the control signals on pins 1–6, 0 V on pin 8 and power on pin 7, while Pulsar and Clay Paky have power on pin 1, 0 V on pin 2 and channel outputs on pins 3 to 8. The polarity of the power supply and control signals relative to ground also varies, with Strand having negative voltages, but most other brands having positive voltages.

== Other designs ==
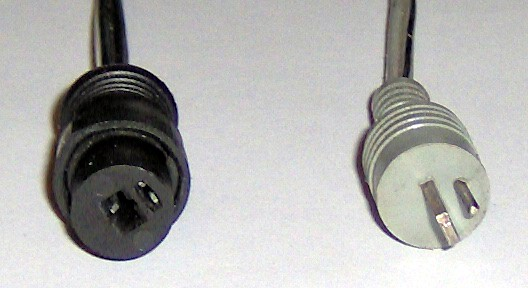
Speaker DIN line socket (left) and plug (right)

A polarised two-pin unshielded connector, designed for connecting a loudspeaker to a power amplifier (or other device; many of the earlier shoebox style tape recorders used them), is known as the DIN 41529 loudspeaker connector. It commonly exists as a panel-mounting female version, and line-mounted male and female versions, although there were rare panel mounted male connectors, for example fitted on the external speaker boxes on certain early 1980s Luxor TV sets. The male version has a central flat pin, and circular pin mounted off-centre. The circular pin is connected to the positive line (red) while the spade is connected to the negative line (black). The panel-mounting female version is available with or without an auxiliary contact that disconnects the internal speaker of the device if an external speaker connector is inserted. Most common is a three-hole female connector with one circular hole on either side of the spade hole, one of them with an aux contact and one without, which provides the option to leave the internal speaker connected by inserting the plug twisted by 180°.

Many European car radio/stereo brands used this connector, commonly spaced so close apart that you need smaller male cable connectors. This was commonly used in conjunction with a connector block with two larger and four smaller flat blade connectors with a standardized pinout for power in (main power, memory for radios with electronic settings memory, dashboard light power) and out (for an automatic electric antenna). This setup was commonly combined with an 8-pin DIN connector where pin 1-5 were used for line output for connecting power amplifier (using the same pinout as for home audio equipment, except "tape record" would be front audio out and "tape play" would be rear audio out). The middle pin was used for remote start of an amplifier. If standard 5-pin home audio cables were used the automatic antenna connector could also be used for remote starting an amplifier. Eventually this connector setup was replaced with the later ISO car stereo connector standard.

It is now mainly found on older equipment, such as 16 mm movie projectors.. The connector is used on some LED lamps and halogen lamps to connect the bulb to the power supply. The two-pin DIN plug lacks the outer metal shell, so far less force is required to disconnect the plug accidentally. There are also three- and four-pin versions of this loudspeaker connector, used for example by Bang & Olufsen.

== See also ==
- DIN sync
- Mini-DIN connector
- IBM PC keyboard#Connection
- PS/2 connector
- XLR connector
