= F connector =

Coaxial RF connector used for television and cable Internet

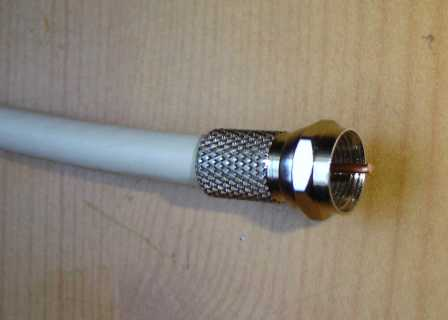
- Male F connector on cable
- Type: RF coaxial connector

Production history
- Designer: Eric E. Winston
- Designed: Early 1950s
- Manufacturer: Various

General specifications
- Diameter: Hex drive (male and female) A/F 7/16 in (11 mm) Female 3/8 in (9.5 mm) external threads Male Varies by cable size
- Cable: Coaxial
- Passband: From 0 Hz to, at least, 2.15 GHz

The F connector (also F-type connector) is a coaxial RF connector commonly used for "over the air" terrestrial television, cable television and universally for satellite television and cable modems, usually with RG-6/U cable or with RG-59/U cable.

The F connector was invented by Eric E. Winston in the early 1950s while working for Jerrold Electronics on their development of cable television. In the 1970s, it became commonplace on VHF, and later UHF, television antenna connections in the United States, as coaxial cables replaced twin-lead. It is now specified in IEC 61169-24:2019.

== Description ==
The F connector is an inexpensive, gendered, threaded compression connector for radio frequency signals. It has good 75 Ω impedance match for frequencies well over 1 GHz and has usable bandwidth up to several GHz.

Connectors mate using a 3/8-32 UNEF thread. The female connector has a socket for the center conductor and external threads. The male connector has a center pin and a captive nut with internal threads.

The design allows for low-cost construction, where cables are terminated almost exclusively with male connectors. The coaxial cable center conductor forms the pin, and cable dielectric extends up to the mating face of the connector. Thus, the male connector consists of only a body, which is generally crimped onto or screwed over the cable shielding braid, and a captive nut, neither of which require tight tolerances. Push-on versions are also available.

Female connectors are typically used on bulkheads or as couplers, often being secured with the same threads as for the connectors. They can be manufactured as a single piece, with center sockets and dielectric, entirely at the factory where tolerances can easily be controlled.

This design is sensitive to the surface properties of the inner conductor (which must be solid wire, not stranded).

=== Weatherproofing ===
The F connector is not weatherproof. Neither the threads nor the joint between male connector body and captive nut provide a water-tight seal. However, male connectors are commonly enhanced with an O-ring (of about 7 mm) inside the captive nut. This seals between the mating faces of both connectors, providing some protection for the center conductor.

Alternatively, waterproof versions or enclosures are recommended for outside use (for example, on antennas). Corrosion resistance, reliability of connector electrical conduction and water resistance can be improved by coating all bare copper wires and the connectors themselves with silicone grease.

== Usage ==
The cable and satellite television entities (as a near standard practice) use compression fittings with F connectors on customer premises. In Europe, block down-converted satellite signals (950–2150 MHz) from LNBs and DC power and block signalling from satellite receivers are near exclusively passed through F connectors.

== Flex F connectors ==
Push-on (a.k.a. flex) F connectors provide poorer shielding against microwave signals of high field strength. This leakage problem is more an artifact of bent or partly broken push-on connectors, but is mostly not observed with compression connectors. Nearby television, FM radio, mobile & cordless phone, and government radiolocation (54–1,002 MHz) transmitters can interfere with CATV or DTH satellite reception or operation if the flex connector is poorly installed.

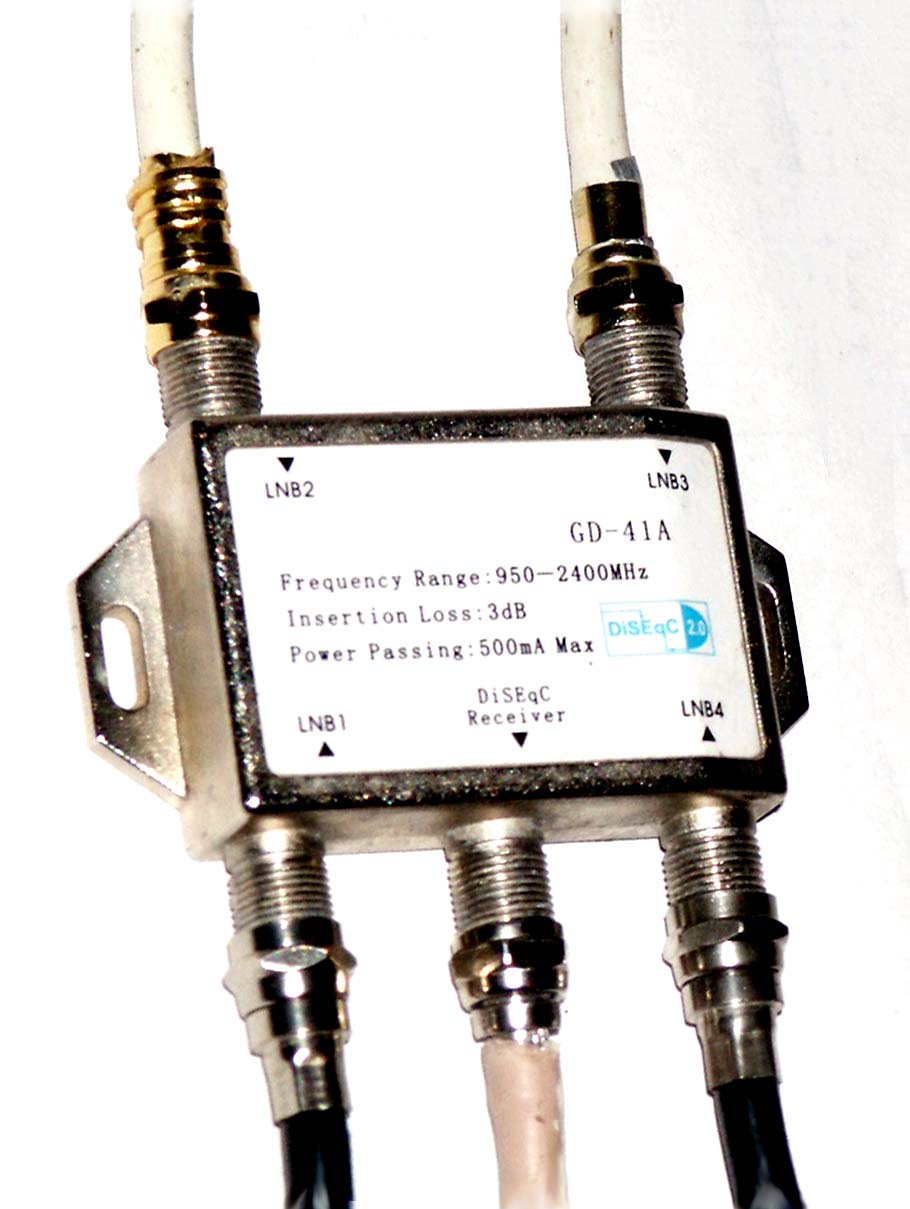
F connectors attached to a four-way DiSEqC switch

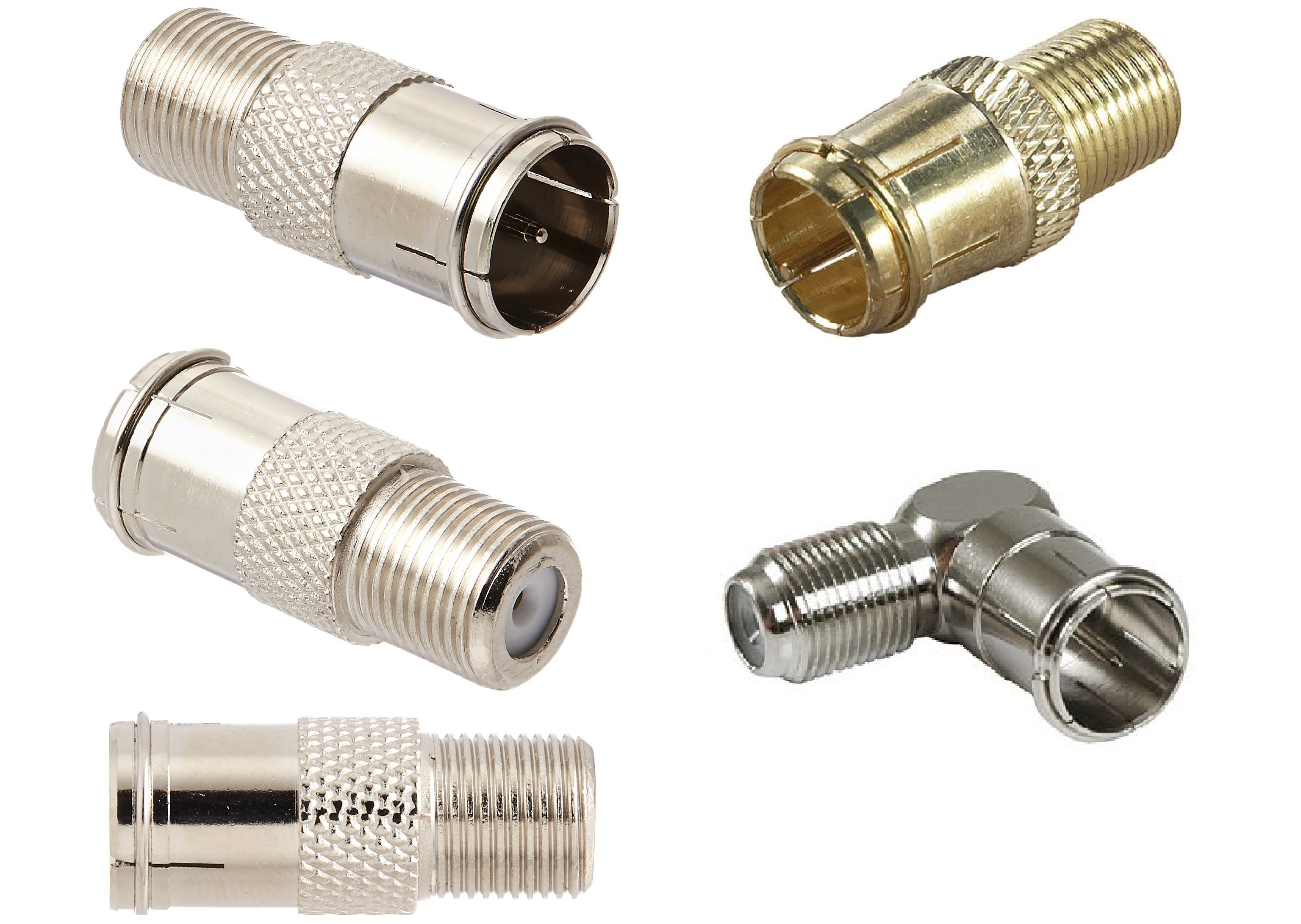
A visual collection of standard and right-angle coaxial F connectors, a commonly used but less-documented form of the F connector

== See also ==
- Belling-Lee connector – RF connector used for television in Europe and elsewhere
- BNC connector
- Coaxial cable
- Component video
- Composite video
- Diplexer
- FME connector
- RCA connector
- Satellite dish
- MCX connector
