= Multimedia extension connector =

A multimedia extension connector (MXC) is a method of connecting video cameras and other video inputs to video capture cards and the like. MXC is based on the 8-pin Mini-DIN connector. It is used by Winnov's range of Videum capture cards.
