= Belling-Lee connector =

Coaxial RF connector used for television

Belling-Lee connectors
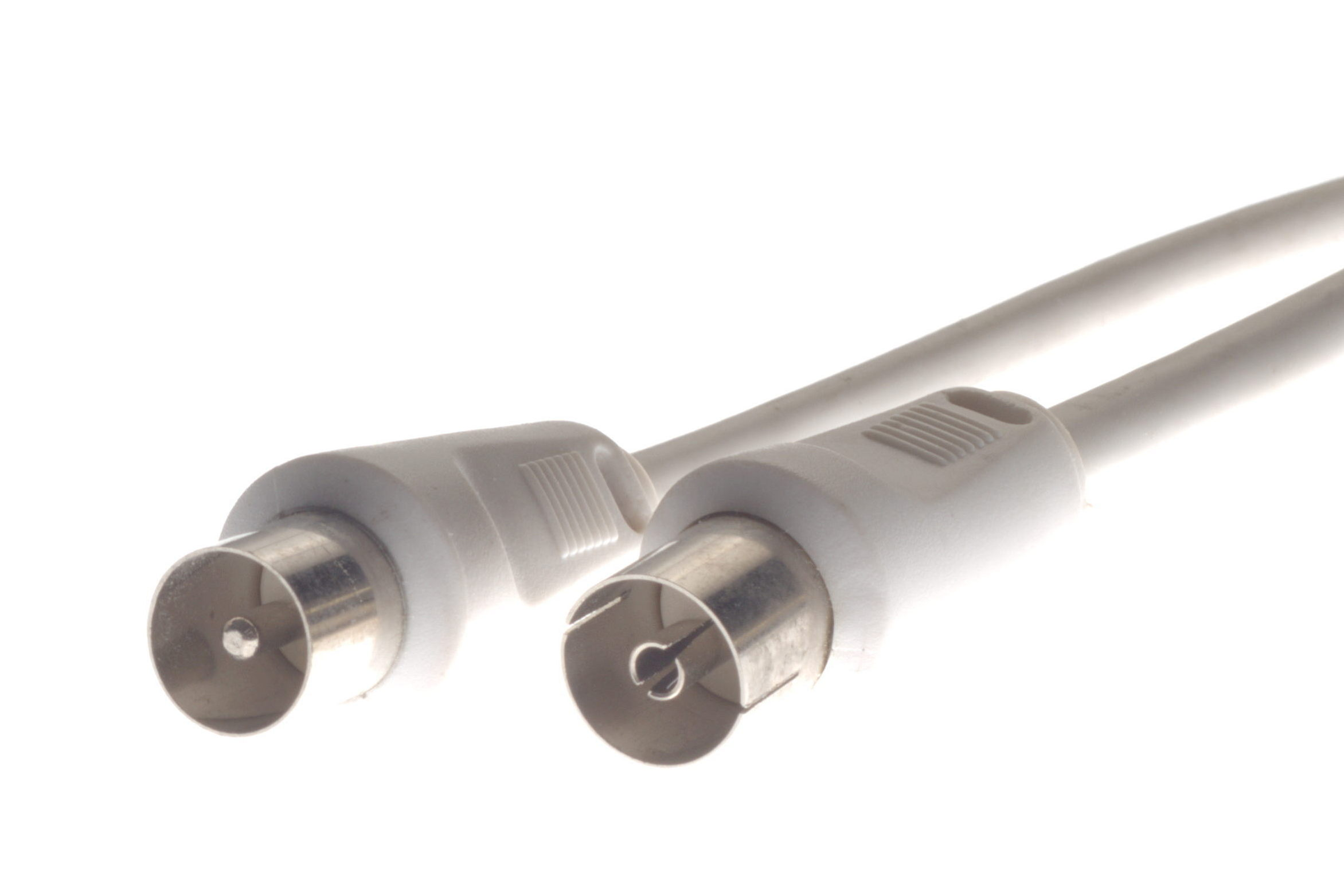
- Male (left) and female (right) Belling-Lee connectors
- Type: RF coaxial connector

Production history
- Designer: Belling & Lee Ltd in Enfield, United Kingdom
- Designed: Around 1922 (Belling-Lee)
- Cable: Coaxial

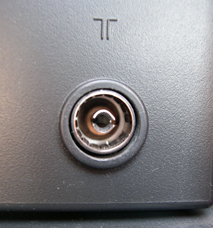
Female Belling-Lee connector on a television set

The Belling-Lee connector (also type 9,52, but largely only in the context of its specification, IEC 61169, Part 2: Radio-frequency coaxial connector of type 9,52) is commonly used in Europe, parts of Southeast Asia, and Australia, to connect coaxial cables with each other and with terrestrial VHF/UHF roof antennas, antenna signal amplifiers, CATV distribution equipment, TV sets, and FM and DAB radio receivers. In these countries, it is known colloquially as an aerial connector, IEC connector, PAL connector, or simply as a TV aerial connector. It is one of the oldest coaxial connectors still commonly used in consumer devices. For television signals, the convention is that the source has a male connector and the receptor has a female connector. For FM radio signals, the convention is that the source has a female connector and the receptor has a male connector. This is more or less universally adopted with TV signals, while it is not uncommon for FM radio receivers to deviate from this, especially FM radio receivers from companies not based in the areas that use this kind of connector.

It was invented at Belling & Lee Ltd in Enfield, United Kingdom (Note: The Belling-Lee company was also known for its 4-millimetre (5/32-inch) low-voltage plugs and sockets (similar to banana connectors but much shorter, with transverse leaf-spring contacts), also fuse-, indicator lamp-, and battery holders) around 1922 at the time of the first BBC broadcasts. Originally intended for use only at MF frequencies (up to 1.6 MHz) when adopted for television they were used for frequencies as high as 957 MHz. Belling Lee Limited still exists as a wholly owned subsidiary of Dialight, since 1992.

In type 9,52, the 9,52, in French SI style, refers to the 9.525-millimetre (3/8-inch) male external and female internal connector body diameter.

In their most common form the connectors just slide together. There is, however, also a screw-coupled variant which is specified to have an M14×1 thread.

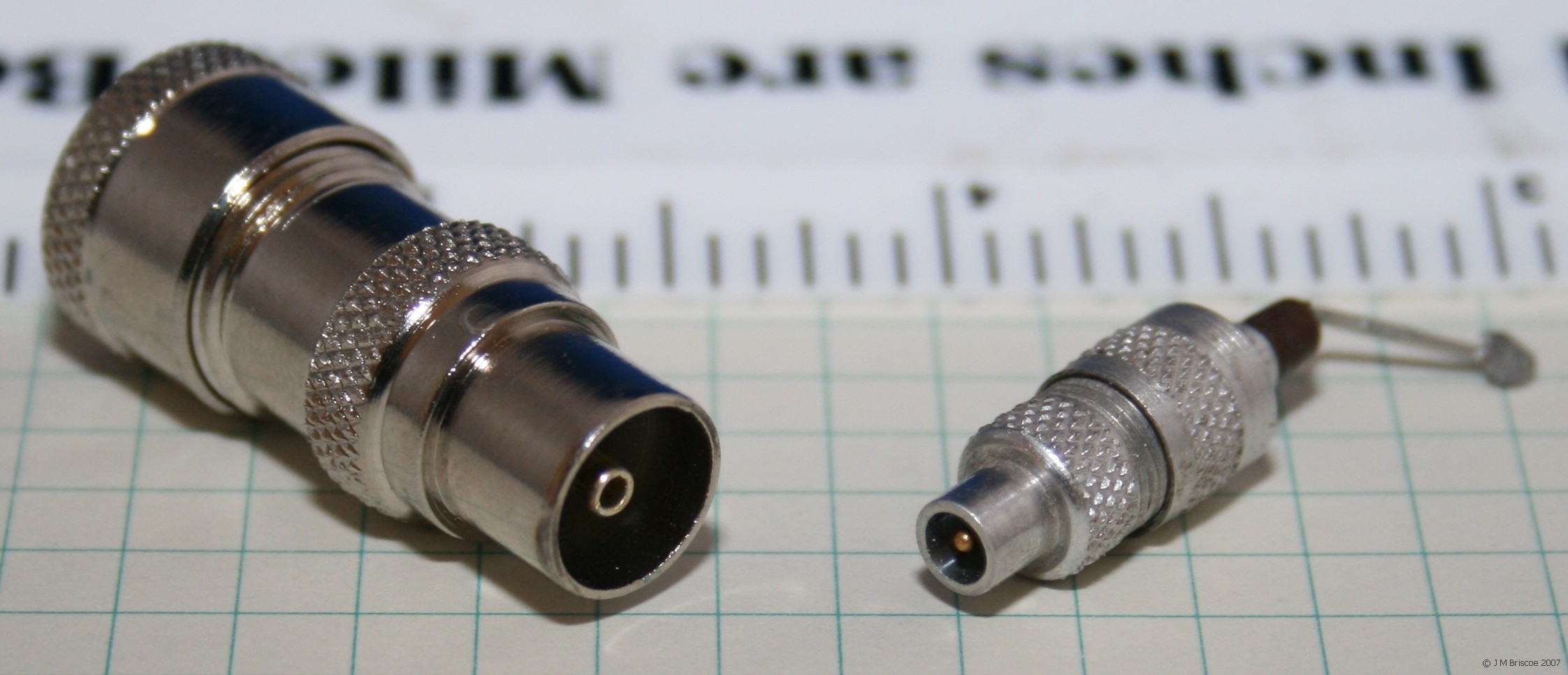
Regular and miniature Belling-Lee plugs

There is also a miniature Belling-Lee connector (L1465 series) which was used for internal connections inside some equipment, including the Research Machines 380Z computer, BBC RC5/3 Band II receiver and the STC AF101 Radio Telephone. The miniature version has a diameter of 0.175 inches (4.4 mm).

== See also ==
- RF connector
- List of RF connector types
- F connector-RF connector used for television in North America and elsewhere
