= QLS connector =

The QLS (Quick Lock Standard) is a quick-locking replacement for the threaded interface of the SMA connector used in radio and microwave applications. It was designed and manufactured by German companies Telegartner and IMS Connector Systems, and was released in 2006.

The connector was designed to address shortcomings of the QMA connector, aiming to provide a locking mechanism that makes it more difficult to accidentally detach, and a longer lifespan.
