= RCA connector =

Electrical connector used for analog audio and video

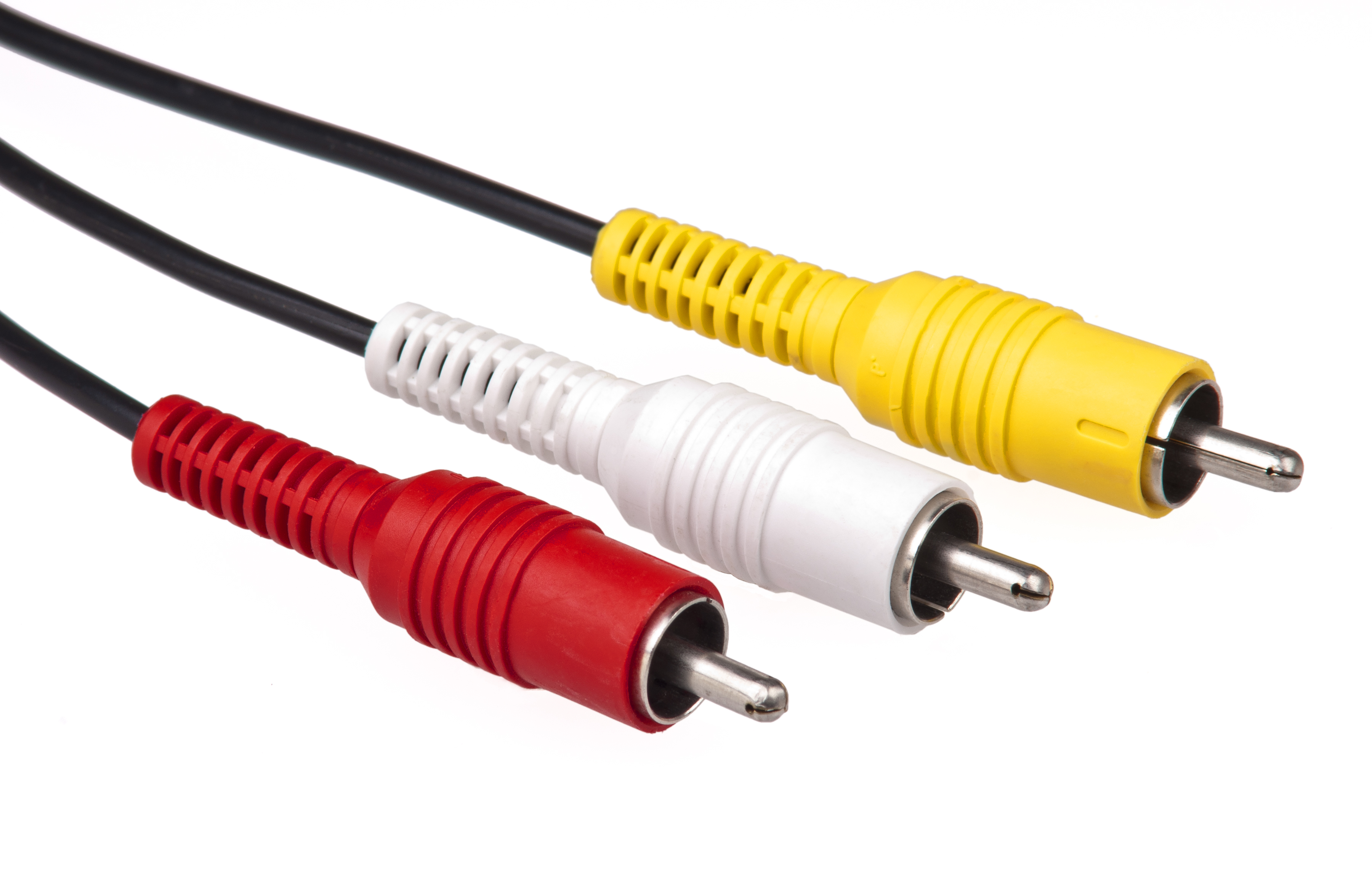
- RCA plugs for composite video (yellow) and stereo audio (white and red)
- Type: RF coaxial connector

Production history
- Designer: Radio Corporation of America
- Designed: 1930s

General specifications
- Diameter: 0.327 in (8.3 mm); 0.126 in (3.2 mm) contact dia.
- Cable: Coaxial
- Passband: Typically 0–100 MHz

The RCA connector is a type of electrical connector commonly used to carry analog audio and video signals. The name refers to the popular name of Radio Corporation of America, which introduced the design in the 1930s.

It is also called a phono connector, referring to its early use to connect a phonograph turntable to an AM radio receiver. As home audio systems became more complex, RCA cables became a standard way to connect components such as radio receivers, amplifiers, turntables, tape decks, and CD players. Their ubiquity led to them also being used for video: connecting AV receivers, analog televisions, videocassette recorders, DVD players, and game consoles. They remain in use as a simple, widely supported means of connection. In some European countries such as France and Germany, the name cinch is still used as an antonomasia of the Chicago-based manufacturer Cinch, for such a connector and socket.

== History ==
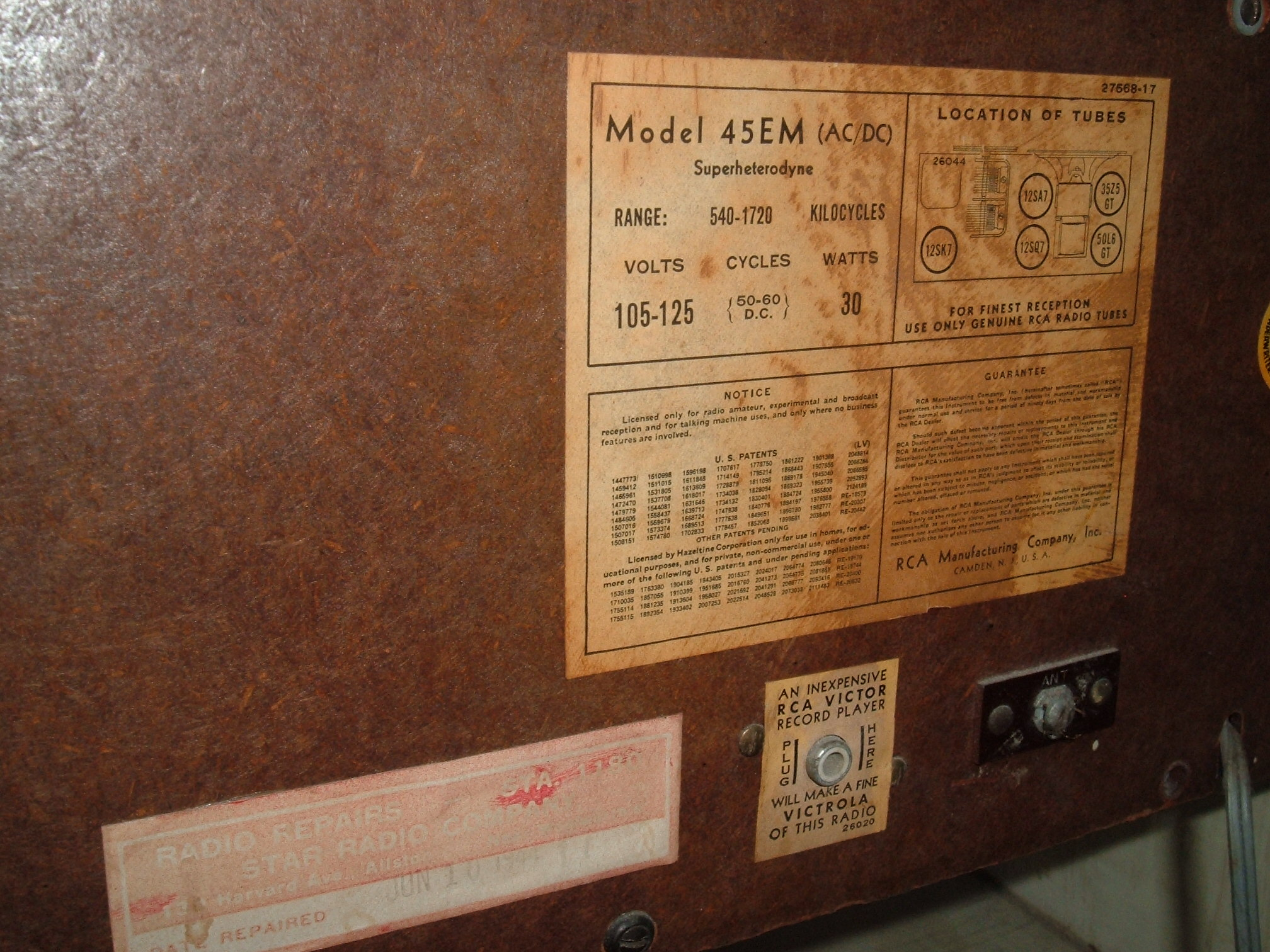
Rear panel of a 1939 RCA model 45EM vacuum tube desktop AM radio with a female RCA jack. Tag reads "An inexpensive RCA Victor record player will make a fine Victrola of this radio. Plug here."

The following dates were derived from historical RCA documentation.

RCA introduced this connector by 1937, when it was used inside an RCA model U-109 radio-phonograph and model R-97 phonograph. In the U-109, the internal amplifier chassis had female connectors that accepted male cables from the internal radio chassis and built-in phonograph player. Originally, the concept was intended as an easy method to unhook sources while troubleshooting the console during servicing.

By 1938, RCA had migrated the female connector to the rear panel of many of their desktop AM radio models to allow customers an easy method to attach an external phonograph or television at a later date. The connector was labeled on the back of radio with one of the following terms: "Victrola", "Phono", "Pick-up", or "Television". RCA later marketed a special turntable for 45 RPM records, the model 9JY.

In 1939, RCA introduced two radio-television floor consoles (TRK-9, TRK-12), which used the same internal connection concept, but the audio output of the television chassis was connected to the radio/amplifier chassis via a male-to-male cable. Three lower-cost 1939 television models had an audio output connector on their rear panel instead of an integrated amplifier and speaker: RCA TT-5, Westinghouse WRT-700, GE HM-171.

In the 1950s, RCA connectors began to replace the older 1/4 inch (6.35 mm) phone connectors for many other applications in the consumer audio world when component high-fidelity systems started becoming popular during the transistor revolution. Refinement of the RCA connectors came with later designs, although they remained compatible.

In the 1980s, some computer monitors and TVs had a RCA jack for composite video input. These were typically high end TVs for the time, a notable example being the Sony ProFeel line. While in theory this improved image quality by eliminating the need for an RF modulator, when connecting devices such as VCRs and computers, there was no guarantee for higher image quality. Later, some televisions had RCA jacks for audio and video out or component video inputs.

== Other uses ==
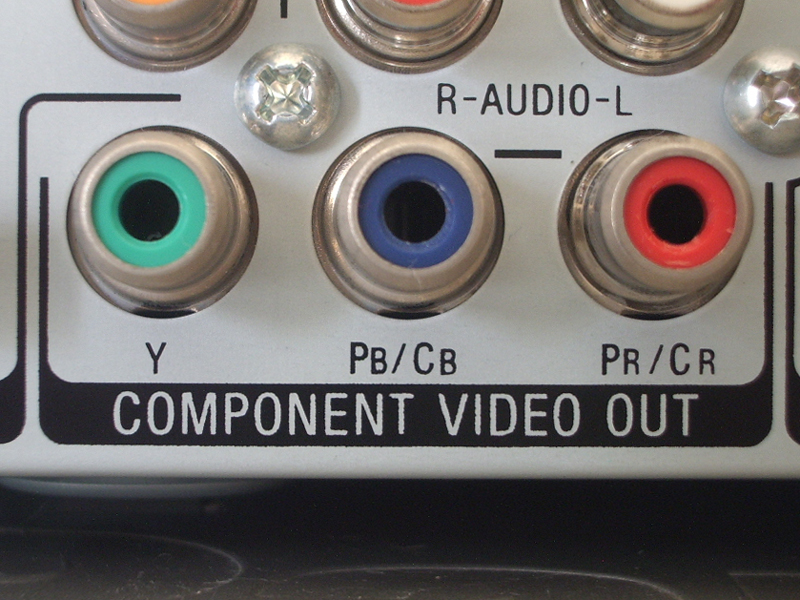
RCA female jacks used for YPbPr component video output

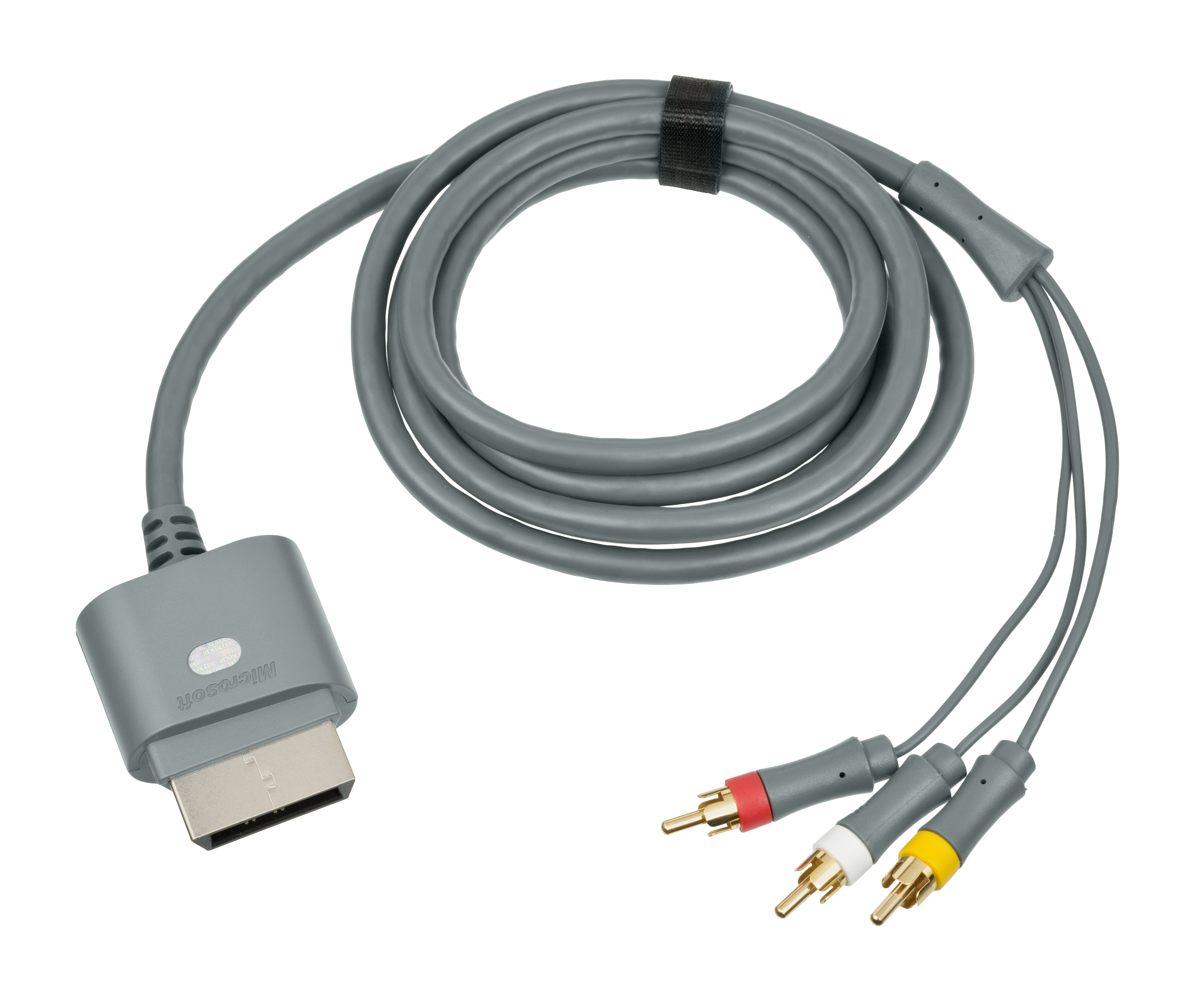
Composite video cable with RCA male plugs for the Xbox 360

In the most normal use, cables have a standard plug on each end, consisting of a central male connector, surrounded by a ring. The ring is often segmented to provide spring gripping pressure when mated. Devices mount the socket (female jack), consisting of a central hole with a ring of metal around it. The ring on the jack is slightly smaller in diameter and longer than the ring on the plug, allowing the plug's ring to fit tightly over it. The jack has a small area between the outer and inner rings which is filled with an insulator, typically plastic (very early versions, or those made for use as RF connectors, used ceramic).

The RCA connector was initially used for audio signals. As with many other connectors, it has been adopted for uses other than originally intended, including as a DC power connector, an RF connector, and as a connector for loudspeaker cables. Its use as a connector for composite video signals is extremely common but provides poor impedance matching: there is neither a standard for plug impedance, nor is it feasible to provide a true match to 75 Ω due to plug dimensions. RCA connectors and cable are also commonly used to carry S/PDIF-formatted digital audio, with plugs colored orange to differentiate them from other typical connections.

Connections are made by pushing the cable's plug into the female jack on the device. The signal-carrying pin protrudes from the plug and often comes into contact with the socket before the grounded rings meet, resulting in a loud hum or buzz if the audio components do not share a common ground and are powered while making connections. Continuous noise can occur if the plug partially falls out of the jack, breaking the ground connection but not the signal. Some variants of the plug, especially cheaper versions, also give very poor grip and contact between the ground sheaths due to their lack of spring action.

They are often color-coded, yellow for composite video, red for the right audio channel, and white or black for the left channel of stereo audio. This trio (or pair) of jacks can often be found on the back of audio and video equipment. One or more sets are often found on TV sets to facilitate connection of camcorders, other portable video sources and video game consoles. Although nearly all connectors, including analog and S/PDIF audio as well as composite and component video, can use identical 75 Ω cables, sales of special-purpose cables for each use have proliferated. Varying cable quality means that a cheap line-level audio cable might not successfully transfer component video. For digital audio, as long as a connection is successfully made using the cables, the sound will remain faithful to the original signal because a digital signal can only be fully received or not received at all. Cables should meet the S/PDIF specification as defined by the international standard IEC 60958-3 for assured performance.

The male plug has a center pin that is 1/8 inch (3.175 mm) in diameter, and is surrounded by an outer shell that is 1/3 inch (8.47 mm) in diameter.

== Disadvantages ==
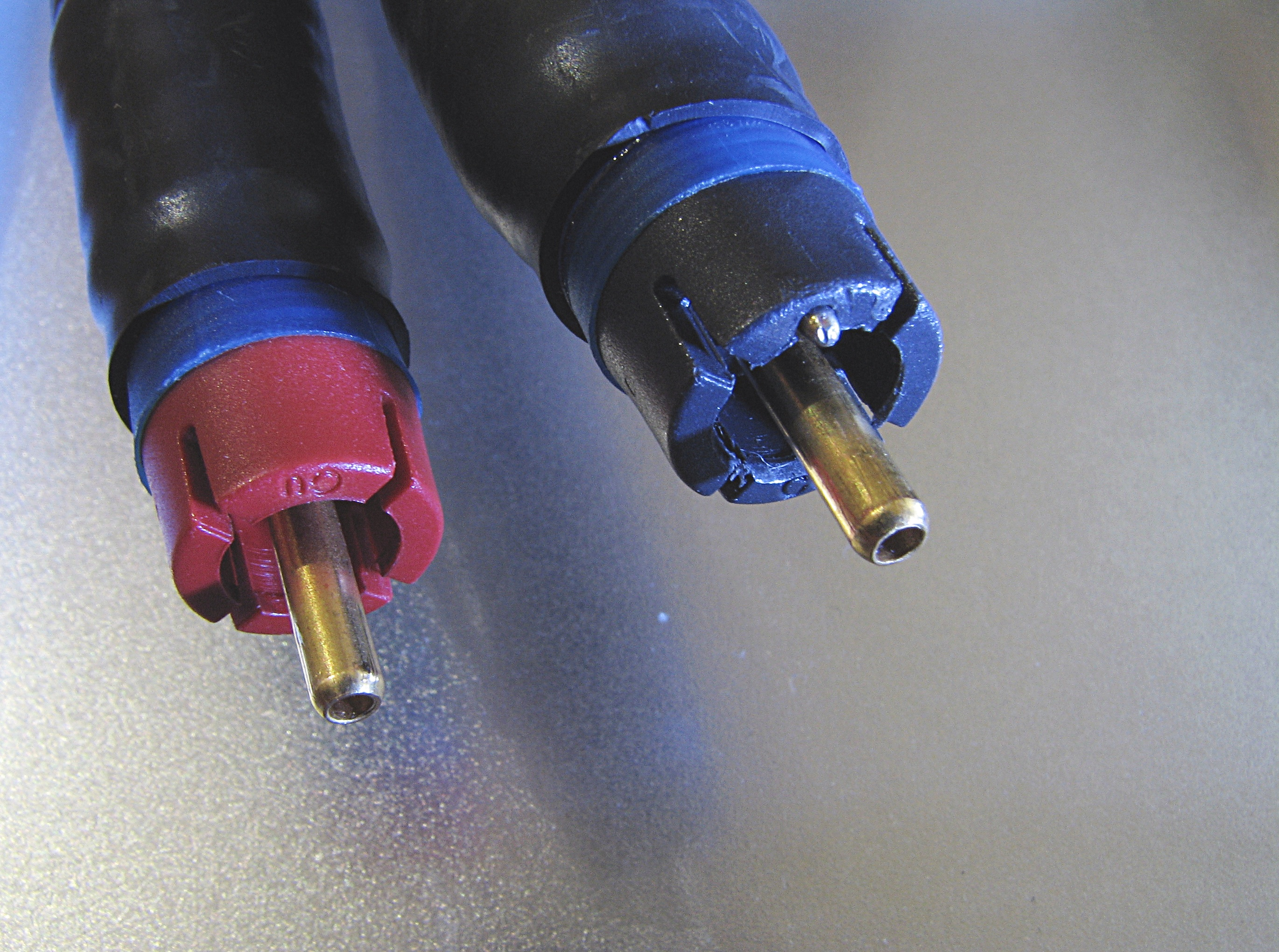
"Bullet plug" variation – Note the hollow center conductor and the pin point for the return signal.

When connecting the male into the female, the inner, hot (signal) connection is made before the ground connection has been guaranteed; this often produces a loud buzz if the equipment is active when the connection is made.

The hot signal wire and signal ground provided by an RCA connection implement an unbalanced connection. A true balanced connection is generally preferred in certain applications, particularly professional settings, because it allows for the use of long cables while reducing susceptibility to external noise.

Using RCA connectors, each signal requires its own plug. Even the simple case of attaching a cassette deck may need four of them – two for stereo input and two for stereo output. In any common setup, this could lead to a disarray of cables and confusion in how to connect them. This situation could be made worse if one considers more complex signals like component video (a total of three for video and two for analog audio, or one for digital coaxial audio).

Attempts were made to introduce combined audio/video connectors for direct signals - the most successful example was the SCART connector, which was successful in Europe but did not enter widespread use elsewhere. For a time, the 5-pin DIN connector was popular for bi-directional stereo connection between A/V equipment, but it has been entirely displaced on modern consumer devices. Though RF modulators inherently transmit combined A/V signals in video applications, they depend on broadcast television systems and RF connectors which are not universal worldwide; RF signals are also generally inferior to direct signals due to protocol conversion and the RF limitations of the three major analog TV systems (NTSC, PAL and SECAM).

Before HD television became a standard, nearly all TV sets, VCRs, and DVD players sold in Europe had SCART connectors, although these were sometimes supplemented by RCA and/or RF connectors. SCART–RCA adapters also exist, which usually allow input of composite video and stereo audio. Outside Europe, separate RCA connectors are usually used, supplemented by RF connectors for backward compatibility and simplicity. Although mini-DIN connectors are used for S-Video connections, composite video, component video, and analog audio (mono or stereo) all use RCA connectors unless the signals are sent via SCART. In the digital realm, however, combined A/V connectors are gaining ground: HDMI is commonly used today for consumer electronics, and DisplayPort, a potential competitor to HDMI, is often found on home computers and peripherals.

== Color coding in consumer equipment ==
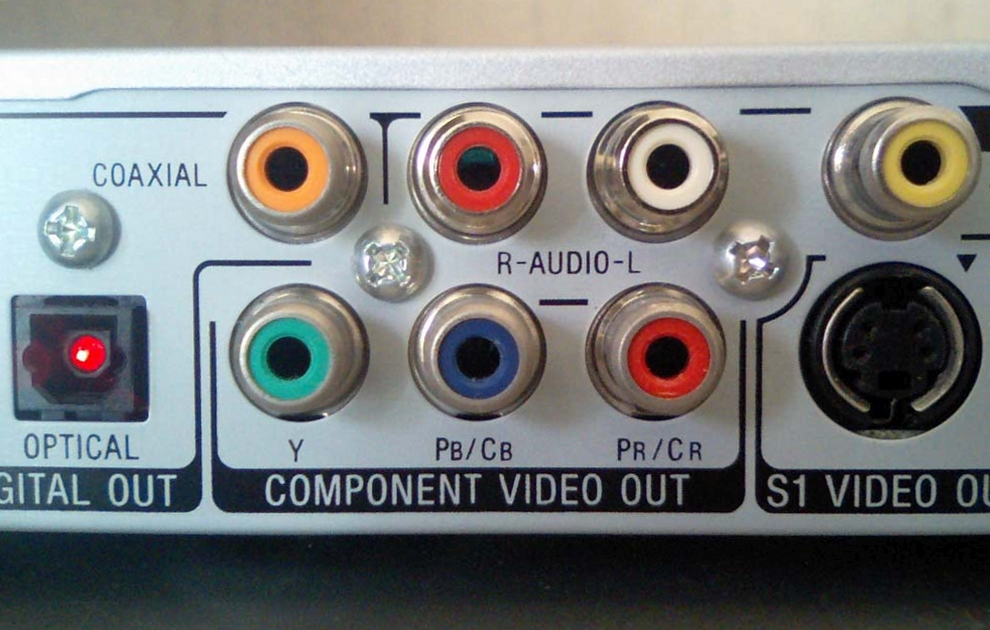
Various color-coded RCA connectors on a DVD player

Plugs and sockets on consumer equipment are conventionally color-coded to aid correct connections. The standard colors for the various signals are shown in the table below; however, beyond 7.1 audio, the standard has degraded to a more general white/yellow, red/blue, and green/yellow color scheme for each cable respectively.

Stereo audio applications use either black and red, grey and red, or white and red RCA connectors; in all three cases, red denotes right. White or purple may also be replaced by black. Some older tape recorders, and equipment like receivers designed to connect to them, use a 5-pin DIN connector to connect left and right for record and playback with a single cable. Adapters between this connector and RCA connectors have used white and red for left and right channel recording, and blue (or sometimes black) and yellow for playback, but this is not universal. Most modern equipment with RCA connectors for recording devices simply uses white and red for all stereo pairs, whether record or playback.

While these are the standard colors found on commercially made products, cables with different-colored connectors may be used, as long as the cable itself is compatible with the application (for example, cables with 75 ohms impedance for video and S/PDIF).

Composite analog video	Composite	Yellow
Analog audio	Left/Mono (record if 4-connector tape cable)	White
Analog audio	Right (record if 4-connector tape cable)	Red
Analog audio	Left tape (play if 4-connector tape cable)	Black
Analog audio	Right tape (play if 4-connector tape cable)	Yellow
Analog audio	Center	Green
Analog audio	Left surround	Blue
Analog audio	Right surround	Grey
Analog audio	Left back surround	Brown
Analog audio	Right back surround	Tan
Analog audio	Subwoofer	Purple
Digital audio	S/PDIF	Orange
Component analog video (YP_{B}P_{R})	Y	Green
Component analog video (YP_{B}P_{R})	P_{B}/C_{B}	Blue
Component analog video (YP_{B}P_{R})	P_{R}/C_{R}	Red
Component analog video/VGA (RGB/HV)	R	Red
Component analog video/VGA (RGB/HV)	G	Green
Component analog video/VGA (RGB/HV)	B	Blue
Component analog video/VGA (RGB/HV)	H (horizontal sync)/S (composite sync)	Yellow
Component analog video/VGA (RGB/HV)	V (vertical sync)	White

== Examples of devices with RCA jacks ==
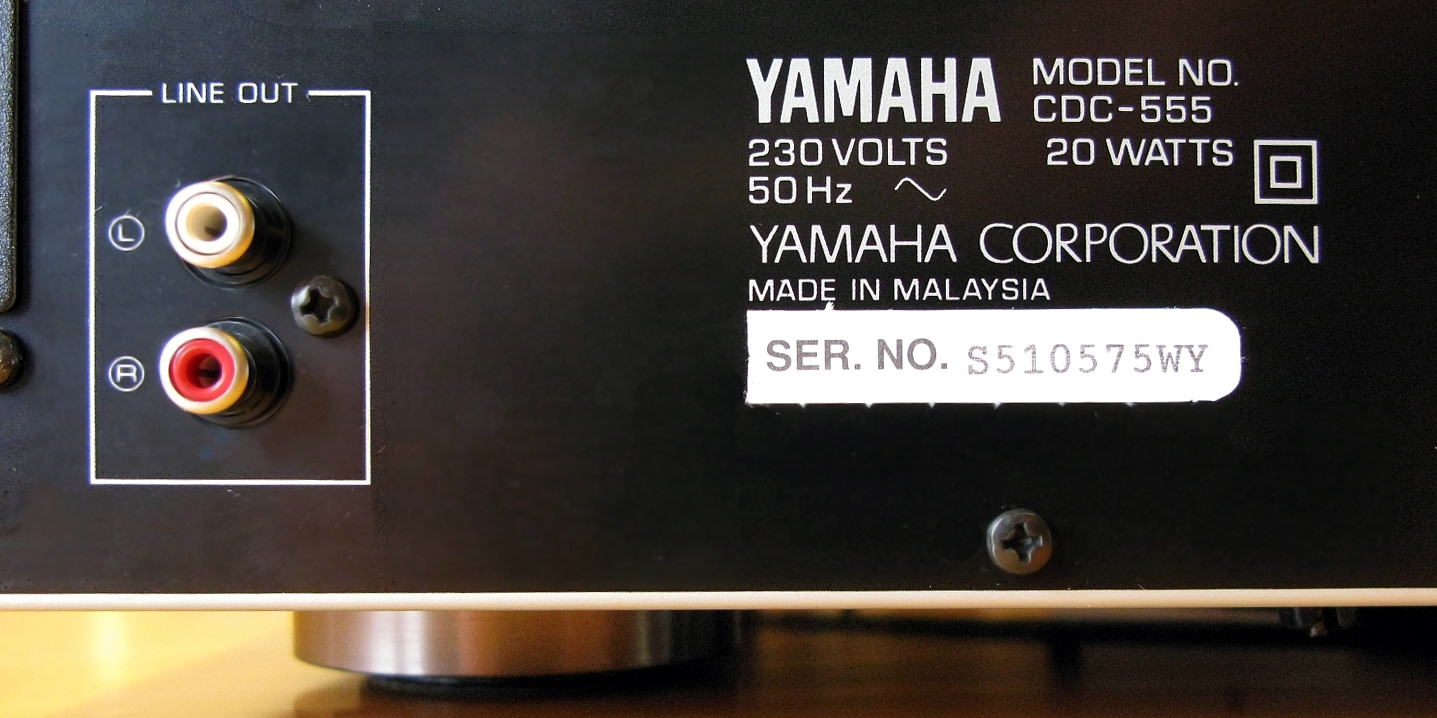
RCA stereo output on a CD player

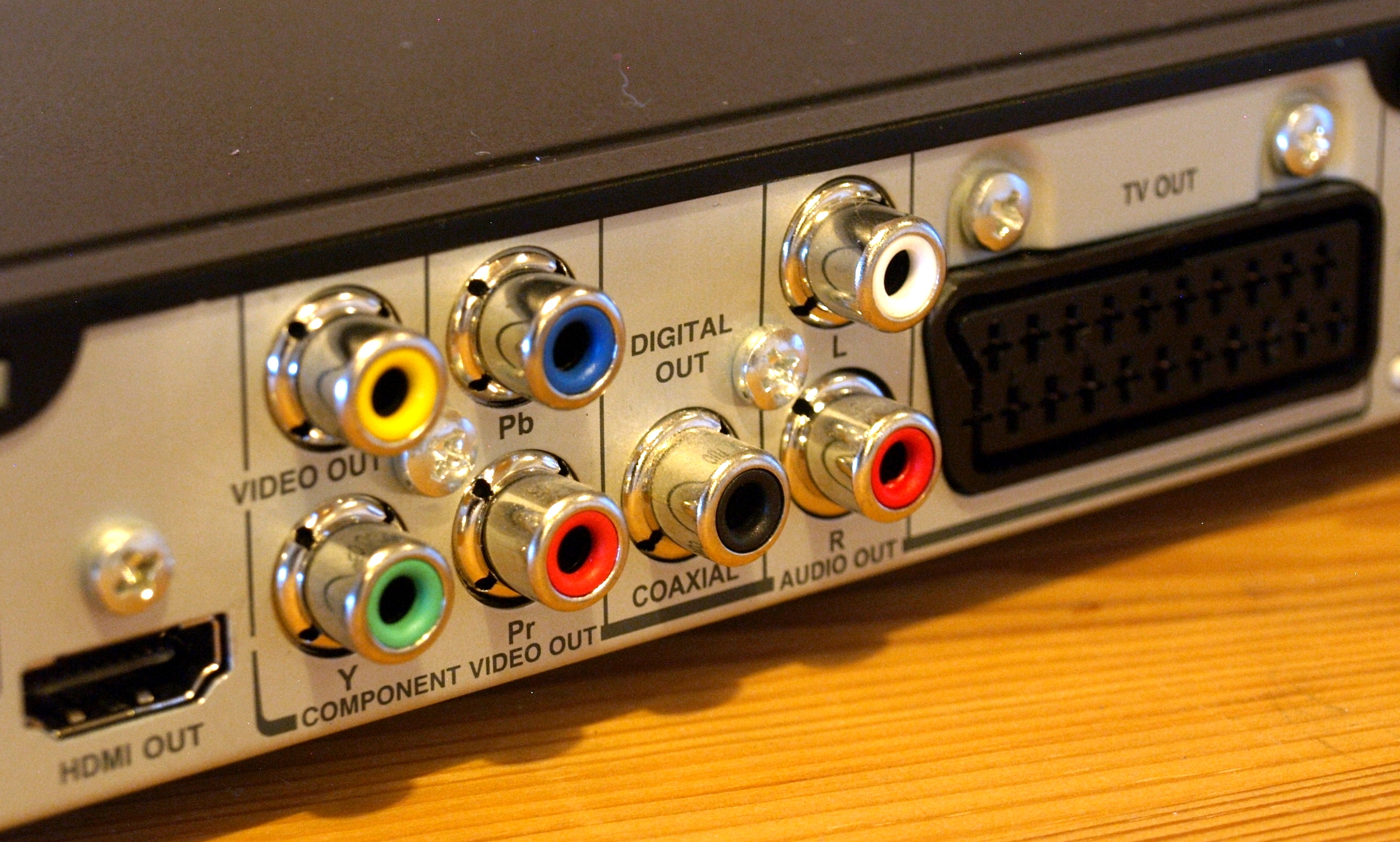
DVD player with video and audio outputs

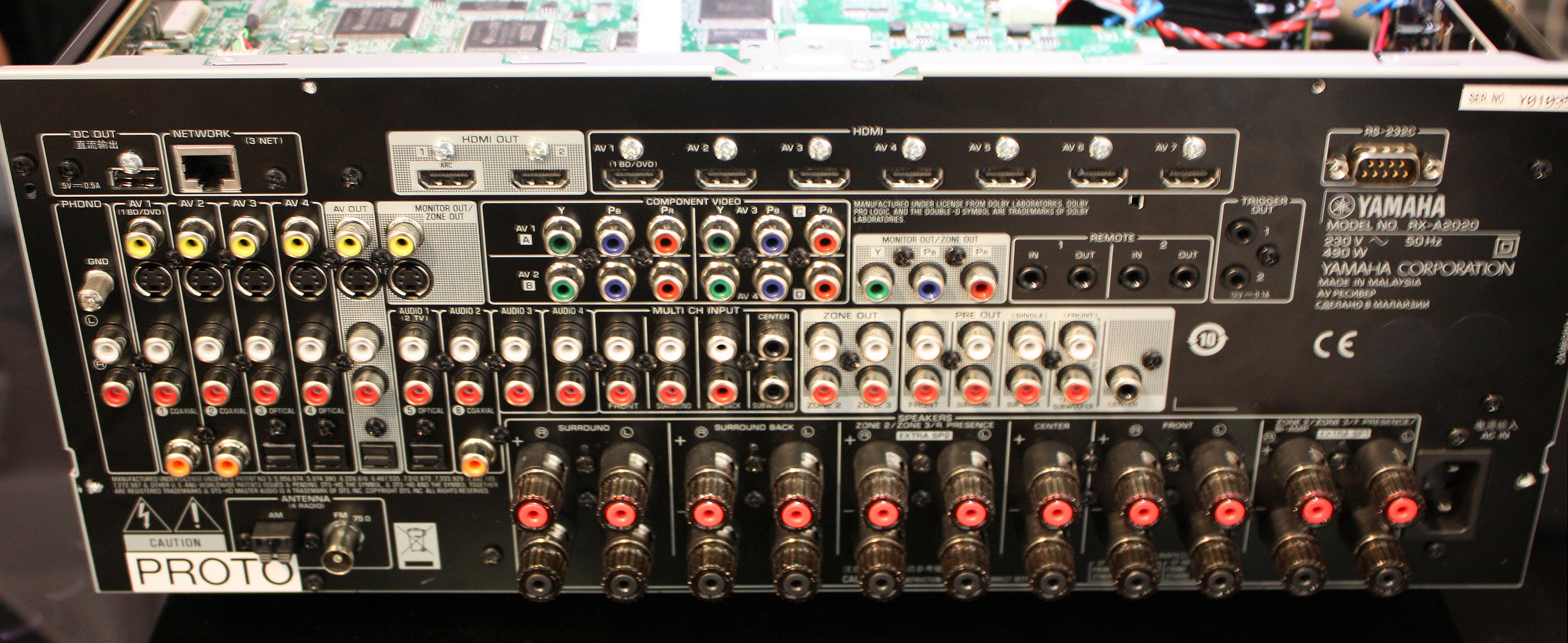
Backside of an AV Receiver from 2012

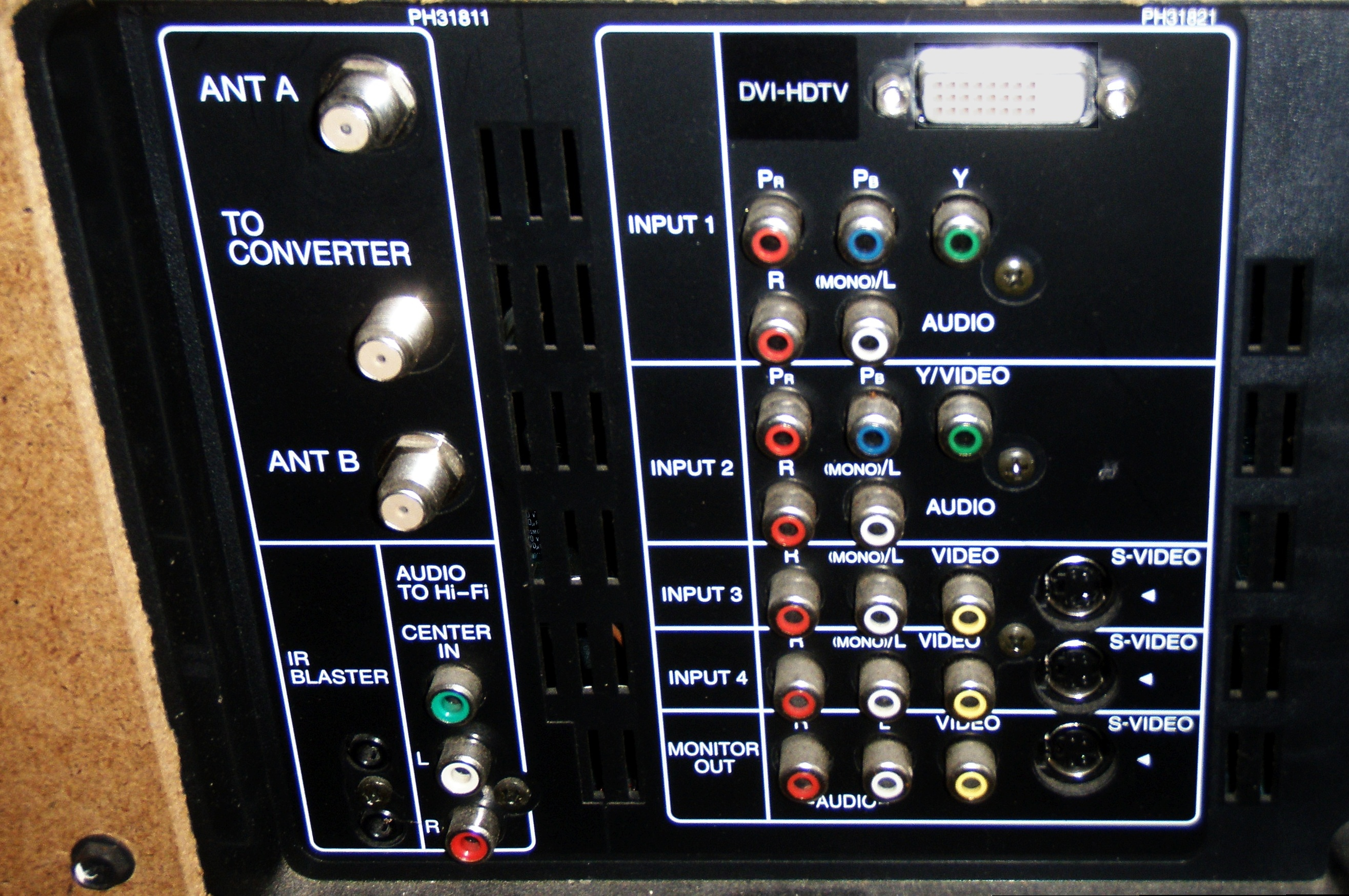
Early 2000s CRT projection TV with 1080i HD ready capabilities

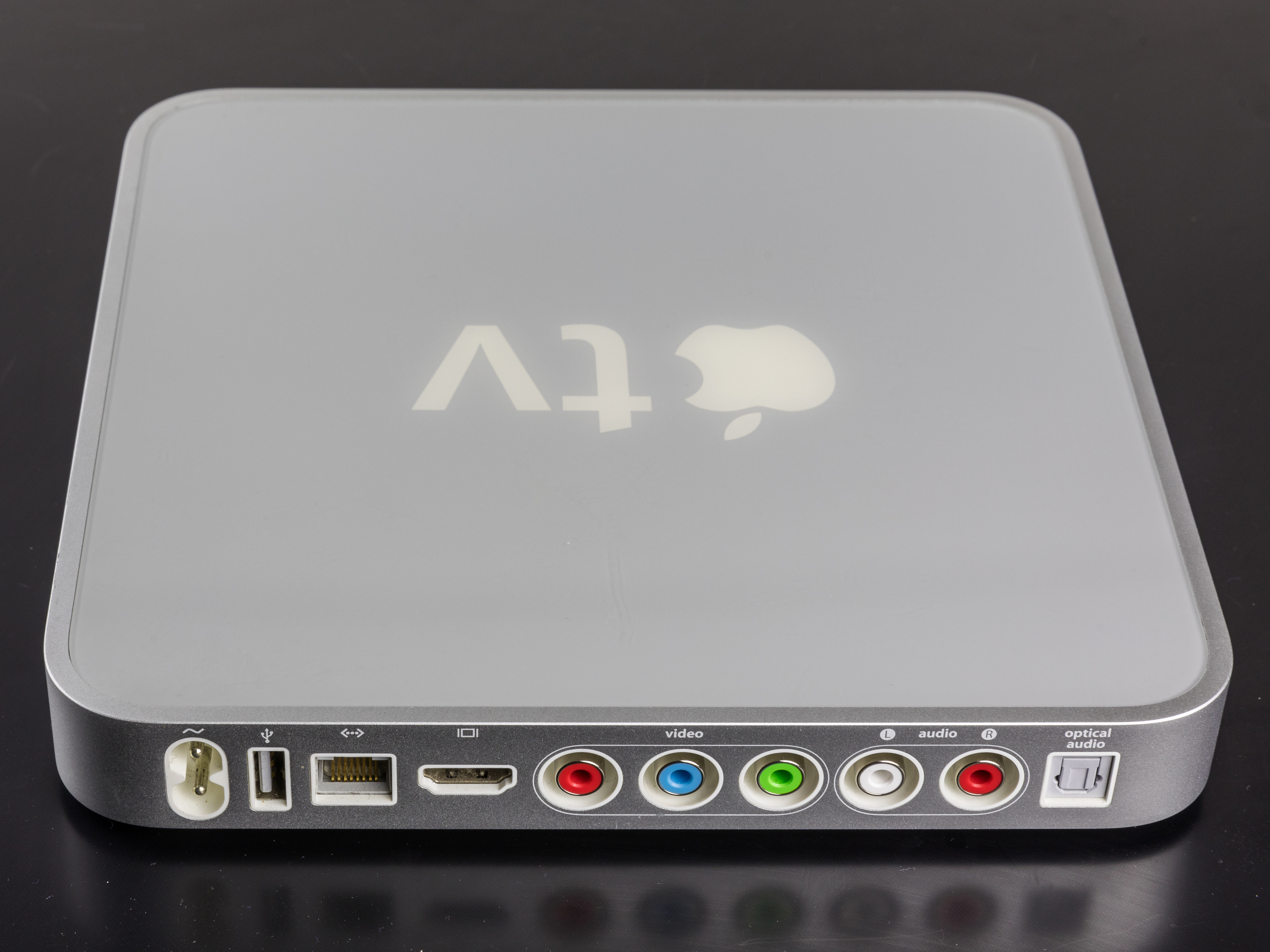
First generation of the Apple TV with RCA stereo outputs
