= Concentric twinax connector =

A concentric twinax connector has a center pin (signal high) and a cylindrical intermediate contact (signal low) as compared to a dual polarized pin type.

These connectors are also used for connecting Triaxial cable.

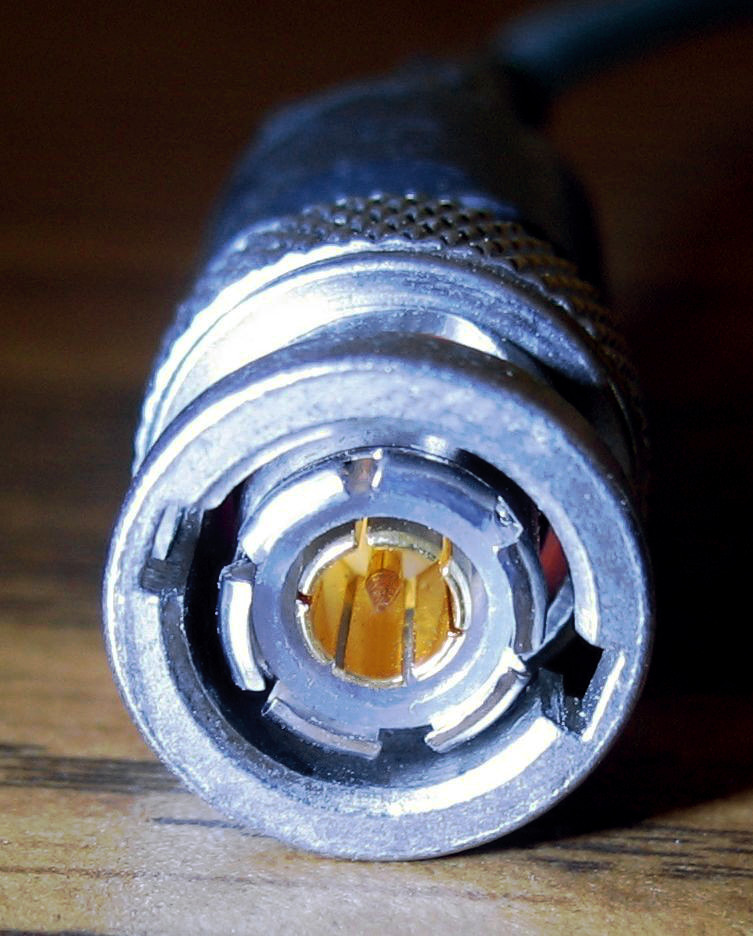
Triaxial BNC connector

== MIL-STD-1553 ==
Since MIL-STD-1553B does not specify the type of connector to be employed in data bus applications, the connectors must be compatible with cable delineated in the specification. However, specific military connector specifications are relevant or have evolved as a result of data bus applications. The primary applicable specifications are MIL-C-39012 (relative to RF coaxial connectors such as BNC, N, etc.), MIL-C-49142 (related to concentric twinax/triax connectors) and MIL-DTL-38999 (related to military type cylindrical connectors).

One of the most popular types of connectors used on the data bus is the concentric twinax bayonet style. These connectors are available in standard (BNC size), miniature and subminiature sizes. Furthermore, connectors are offered in various solder/clamp and crimp assembly versions. Connector interface models are 2-, 3- and 4-lug bayonet as well threaded. Special pin and socket, keying and polarization are also offered.

== See also ==
- IBM 5250
- BNC connector
