= FME connector =

Miniature 50Ω RF connector series

FME
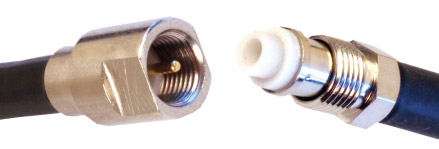
- Type: RF coaxial connector
- Cable: Coaxial
- Passband: Design: 0-200 MHz (Extended past 2GHz by several companies)

FME (For Mobile Equipment) is a miniature 50Ω RF connector series offering excellent performance from DC to 200 MHz used primarily with RG-58 or equivalent coaxial cables employed in mobile applications and installations and marine antennae.

The FME female is designed to be low diameter to allow cables it has been installed on to be snaked through the often tight access holes or spaces of a vehicle to the desired equipment location(s) where an FME male adapter to the required equipment connector series is fitted to the female cable connector. The thread is 8 mm × 0.75 mm pitch, and the centre pin is 1.14–1.22 mm diameter, with radiused end.

There is an extensive array of FME inter-series adapters available and a male cable connector is also offered for both RG-58 and RG-174 type cables to facilitate extensions, splices or transitions.
