= QMA and QN connector =

Quick-connect radio frequency connectors

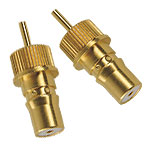
- QMA connector
- Type: RF coaxial connector

Production history
- Designer: Quick Lock Formula Alliance
- Designed: 2003
- Manufacturer: Various
- Cable: Coaxial
- Passband: Typically 0-6 GHz

QMA and QN connectors are quick-connect RF connectors that were designed to replace the widely used SMA (used in low power transmissions; DC–18 GHz) and Type N (used in medium power transmissions; DC–11 GHz) connectors. The connectors have been available since 2003. The connector family was created by the Quick Lock Formula Alliance, which consists of Huber+Suhner, Radiall, Rosenberger Hochfrequenztechnik, and Amphenol.

QMA and QN connectors are the quick lock version of SMA and N connectors. This design can save much handling time because it allows quick mating and demating without tools. Due to the smaller overall size, it can save the operating space and allows for high density arrangement. To make cable routing easier, it can rotate 360 degrees after installation.

== Design goals ==
The design had three main goals:

1. replace the traditional threaded connection of SMA and N with a snap-fastening to allow for faster mating and de-mating and eliminate the need for a torque wrench
2. decrease the overall size of the connector while still matching the electronic performance and reliability of their extremely popular predecessors
3. allow for 360° cable rotation after installation in order to make cable routing easier.

== Applications ==
Common applications for the QMA and QN connectors include cellular base stations, antennas, and various defense applications. Since an industry standard for quick-locking SMA and N connectors has yet to be established, varying designs are currently being manufactured.
