= EEG DIN connector =

The EEG DIN connector (also referred to as DIN 42802 or EEG safety DIN connector) is an electrical connector used to connect medical and biomedical recording systems, such as electrodes for electroencephalography.

In 1989, the Deutsches Institut für Normung issued DIN 42802, standardizing a "touch-proof connector for electromedical applications." It became widely adopted when regulatory bodies pressured the industry to insulate connectors in clinical settings, as specified in IEC 60601-1 (subclause 56.3(c)).

The EEG DIN connector has two variations, both featuring touch-proof sockets around in-line rigid plugs:

- The DIN 42802-1 connector with a 1.5 mm diameter pin, formally specified in DIN 42802; and
- The E-DIN 42802-2 connector with a 2 mm diameter pin, a de facto standard not specified in DIN 42802
