= Microdot connector =

Microdot, a company previously based in South Pasadena, California and now owned by Tyco Electronics manufactures a wide range of coaxial and multi-pin connectors that have been used since the 1950s for instrumentation and aerospace applications. While the company makes various proprietary and industry-standard connectors, they are best known for a small coaxial connector which has become known as "the" Microdot connector. In its most common version, called the S-50 series, it uses a 10-32 (0.190-32 UNF2B) thread. This connector is used worldwide for accelerometers, small microphones and various other transducers.
