= RF connector =

Electrical connector designed to work at radio frequencies

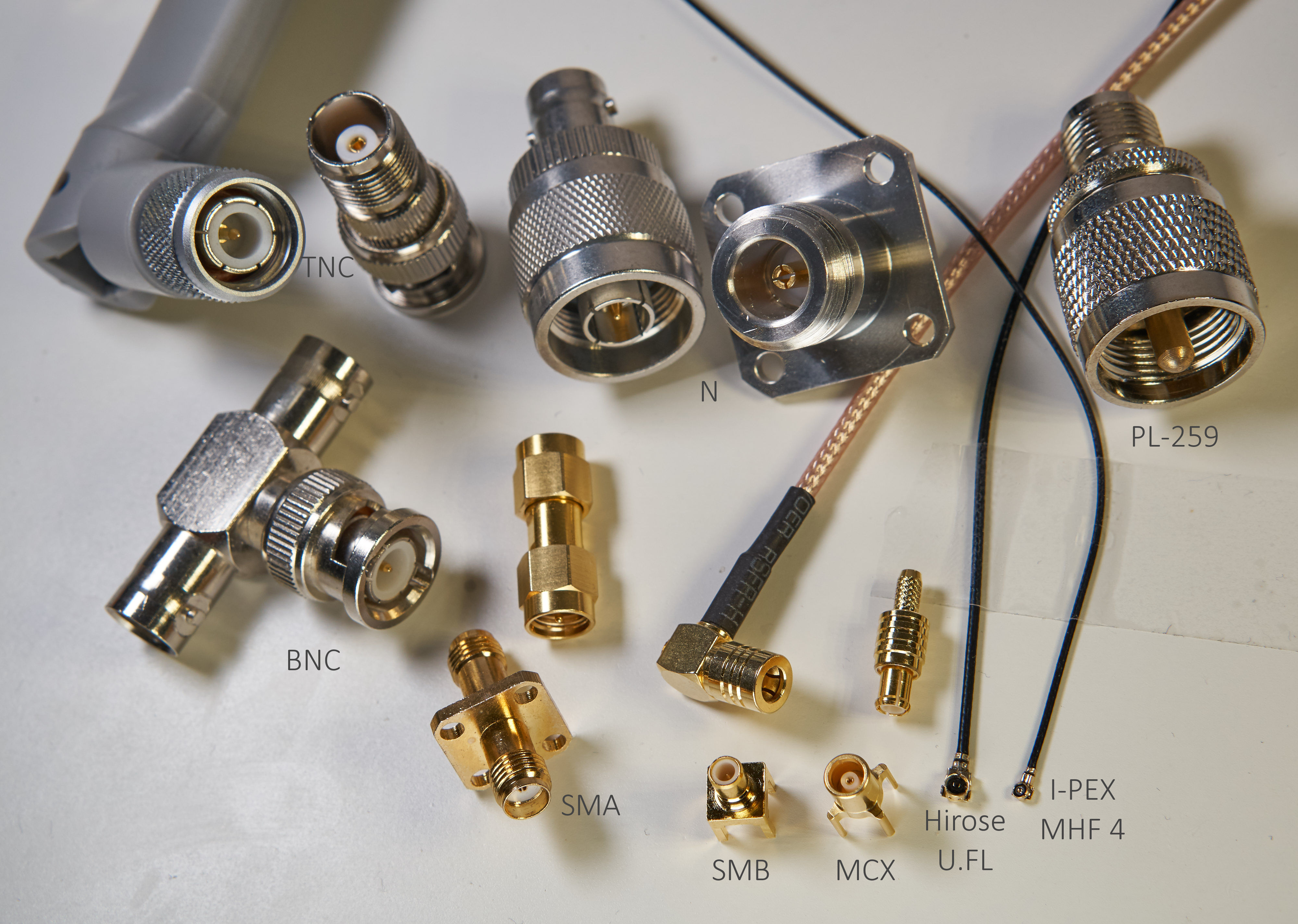
Various popular RF connectors

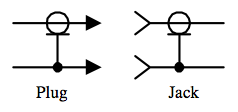
Electronic symbols for the plug and jack coaxial connectors

Time-domain reflectometry shows reflections due to impedance variations in mated RF connectors.

An RF connector (radio frequency connector) is an electrical connector designed to work at radio frequencies. Depending on design, RF connectors may support signals with frequency content up to 250GHz (see List of RF connector types). RF connectors are typically used with coaxial cables and are designed to maintain the shielding that the coaxial design offers. Many variants also minimize the change in characteristic impedance at the connection in order to reduce signal reflection and power loss. As the frequency increases, transmission line effects become more important, with small impedance variations from connectors causing the signal to reflect rather than pass through. An RF connector must not allow external signals into the circuit through electromagnetic interference and capacitive pickup.

Mechanically, RF connectors may provide a fastening mechanism (thread, bayonet, braces, blind mate) and springs for a low-ohmic electric contact while sparing the contacts' surface, thus allowing very high mating cycles and reducing the insertion force. Research activity in the area of radio-frequency circuit design has surged in the 2000s in direct response to the enormous market demand for inexpensive, high-data-rate wireless transceivers.

Common types of RF connectors are used for television receivers, two-way radio, Wi-Fi PCIe cards with removable antennas, and industrial or scientific measurement instruments using radio frequencies.

== See also ==
- List of RF connector types
- Antenna socket
- Optical fiber connector
