= GR connector =

GR-874
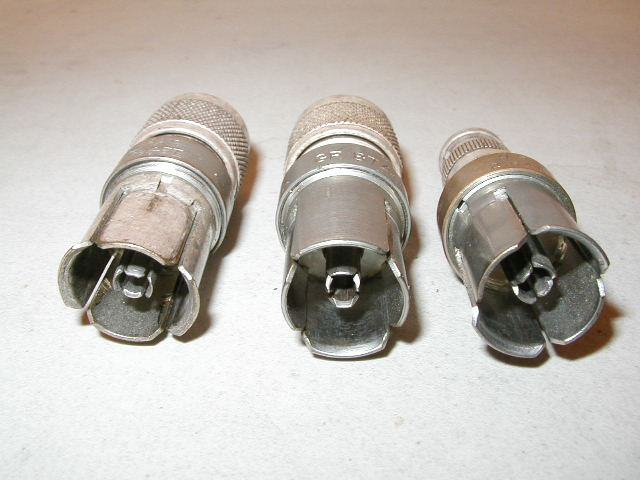
- Type: RF coaxial connector

Production history
- Designed: 1947-1948
- Manufacturer: General Radio
- Cable: Coaxial

The GR connector, officially the General Radio Type 874, was a type of RF connector used for connecting coaxial cable. Designed by Eduard Karplus, Harold M. Wilson and William R. Thurston at General Radio Corporation, it was widely used on General Radio's electronic test equipment as well as some other manufacturers' (e.g. Tektronix, Hewlett-Packard, Philips) instruments from the 1950s to the 1970s.

The connector had several desirable properties:

- Good control of the electrical impedance across a wide range of frequencies, therefore low reflection
- Reliable mating
- Hermaphrodism, so there were no "male" or "female" connectors; any GR connector could mate with any other GR connector.

This last characteristic was achieved by having both the inner and outer conductors made from four leaves, two of which were displaced slightly outwards and two of which were displaced slightly inwards. By rotating one connector by 90 degrees, its inner leaves would mate with the other connector's outer leaves and vice versa.

When frequently mated, the inner leaves were susceptible to breakage due to stubbing, flexing and fatigue cracking as the connector was pressed together and alignment was perfected.

In 1961, an optional locking mechanism consisting of an outer hex nut encasing a captured threaded barrel was added to the 874 line. It can be seen in the photograph of a GR-900 to GR-874 adapter. The locking assembly is not captive and can be backed off the RF connector. The threaded barrel is supplied on each connector. The threaded barrel was withdrawn into the nut on one connector and extended on the other to allow the barrel to engage the nut of both mating connectors. This style of locking mechanism was continued in GR-874's thematic successors; the GR-900 precision 14 mm connector that retains a crenelated hermaphroditic mechanical anti-spin feature to protect the sexless RF interface from rotating and galling when the locking mechanism is tightened, and the fully genderless APC-7 7 mm connector.

Adapters to other connector series were available.

Eventually, the limited frequency range of a 14 mm connector and its high manufacturing cost overcame its ease of assembly and the GR-874 was supplanted generally by the 7 mm type N connector and its variants, the BNC connector and the TNC connector, and the later higher frequency 3.5 mm SMA connectors. General Radio, then still a major source of RF test equipment, designed the incompatible GR-900 as a 14 mm successor to the GR-874, filling the industry's need for a higher performance genderless connector for fully reversible lab standards and related test equipment. The GR-900 was in turn succeeded in this essential niche role by the APC-7 connector.
