= Cable matcher =

Cable matcher may refer to:

- Gender changer for the coaxial cable
- Coaxial impedance matching adapter
