= HQB =

HQB may refer to:

- Hallie Q. Brown Community Center, American social service agency
- High quality beef, term used in 2008 World Trade Organization decision in the beef hormone controversy
- HQB, IEC 81346 code for separation grate
