= Eduard Karplus =

- Born: September 7, 1899; Hinterbrühl, Mödling, Austria
- Died: August 1, 1979 (aged 80); Belmont, Massachusetts, U.S.
- Education: Technical University of Vienna
- Scientific career
- Fields: Electrical engineering

Eduard Karplus (September 7, 1899 – August ?, 1979) was an Austrian-born engineer, best known as the inventor of the Variac.

Karplus was born in Hinterbrühl, the second child of Johann Paul Karplus, a neurophysiologist and psychiatrist, and Valerie von Lieben, a sister of physicist Robert von Lieben. He had three brothers, Johann (Hans) Karplus (father of 2013 Nobel Laureate in Chemistry, Martin Karplus), Walter Gottlieb Karplus and Heinrich Karplus.

Eduard attended Gymnasium Stubenbastei in Vienna, completing with Matura in 1918, and graduated as "Diplomingenieur" from the Electrical Engineering department of the Vienna University of Technology in 1923.

From 1923 to 1929, he was employed in the radio frequency laboratories of the C. Lorenz AG, Berlin, Germany, where he worked on mobile high-frequency communication equipment.

In 1930, Eduard Karplus joined the engineering staff of General Radio Corporation in Cambridge, Massachusetts, where he designed and developed measuring instruments, including work on early models of oscilloscopes.

Karplus' best-known invention is the development of the first practical, continuously adjustable variable-ratio autotransformer, which General Radio introduced under the "Variac" brand name (short for "variable AC") in 1933. In the 1940s and 1950, he continued to work on microwave topics such as signal generators, including the design of the GR connector.

He was a member of the American Institute of Electrical Engineers and a Fellow of the Institute of Radio Engineers (since 1938) .

== Personal life ==
Karplus was married to Harriet Green (1909-2004). He died in Belmont, Massachusetts, in August 1979.

== Publications and patents ==
- Karplus, Eduard (July 1944). "Design of Variac Transformers". Electrical Engineering. 63 (7): 508–513. doi:10.1109/EE.1944.6440390. ISSN 0095-9197. S2CID 51665962.
- DE 481489, "Piezoelectrically driven vacuum-tube oscillator" (1927)
- DE 495552, "Arrangement for transmission and reception of ultrashort waves" (1928)
- DE 499602, "Arrangement for tuning wireless stations" (1928)
- Coupling arrangement for compensated high frequency amplifiers U.S. patent 1856709 Coupling arrangement for compensated high frequency amplifiers (1928)
- DE 499599, "Electron tube with inductors in the leads" (1929)
- Wireless signaling apparatus U.S. patent 1811357 Wireless signaling apparatus (1929)
- Self-contained oscillator tube U.S. patent 1916224 Self-contained oscillator tube (1929)
- Alternating-current apparatus U.S. patent 2009013 Alternating-current apparatus (1934 - the variac patent)
- Ultra-high-frequency tuning apparatus U.S. patent 2367681 Ultra-high-frequency tuning apparatus (1941)
- Ultrahigh-frequency tuning apparatus U.S. patent 2578429 Ultrahigh-frequency tuning apparatus (1945)
