= Gender of connectors and fasteners =

Engineering designation

Schematic symbols for male and female connector pins

In electrical and mechanical trades and manufacturing, each half of a pair of mating connectors or fasteners is conventionally designated as male or female, a distinction referred to as its gender. The female connector is generally a receptacle that receives and holds the male connector. Alternative terms such as plug and socket or jack are sometimes used, particularly for electrical connectors.

The assignment is a direct analogy with male and female genitalia. The part bearing one or more protrusions, or which fits inside the other, is designated male, while the one with the corresponding indentations, or fitting outside the other, is designated female. Extension of the analogy results in the verb to mate being used to describe the process of connecting two corresponding parts together.

In some cases (notably electrical power connectors), the gender of connectors is selected according to rigid rules which enforce a sense of one-way directionality (e.g. a flow of power from one device to another). This is done to enhance safety, or ensure proper functionality, by preventing unsafe or non-functional configurations from being set up.

In terms of mathematical graph theory, an electrical power distribution network made up of plugs and sockets is a directed tree, with the directionality arrows corresponding to the female-to-male transfer of electrical power through each mated connection. This is an example where male and female connectors have been deliberately designed and assigned to physically enforce a safe network topology.

In other contexts, such as plumbing, one-way flow is not enforced through connector gender assignment. Flows through piping networks can be bidirectional, as in underground water distribution networks which have designed-in redundancy. In plumbing situations where one-way flow is desired, it is implemented through other means (e.g. air gaps or one-way check valves), and not through male-female gender schemes.

== Early mentions of the metaphor ==
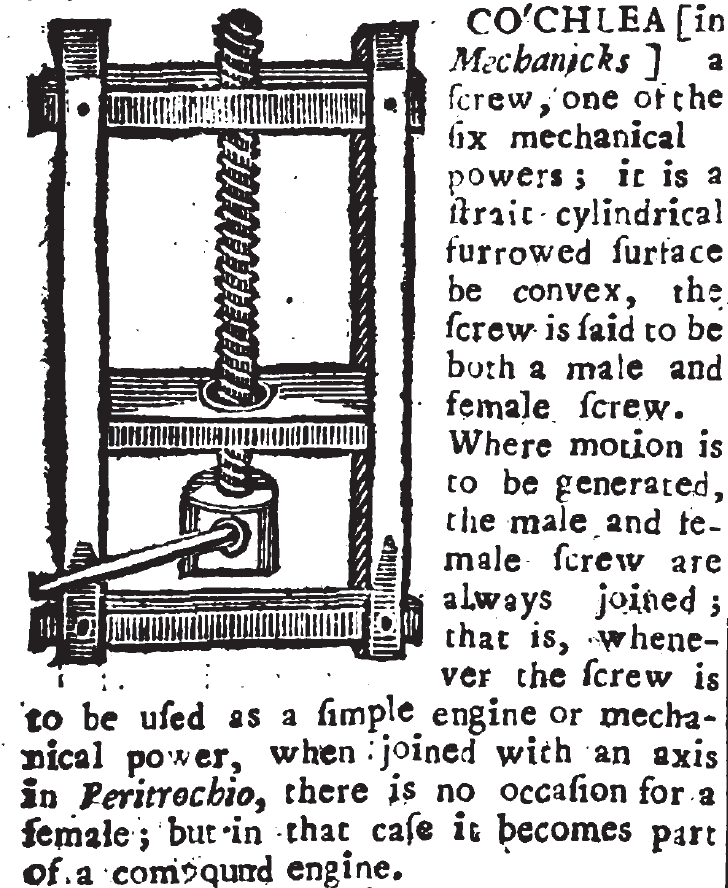
Universal Etymological English Dictionary mentioning male and female screws in 1731

The Talmud describes arrow heads and mating shafts as potentially being either male or female, depending on their construction, i.e. a prong on a male arrow head fits into a hollowed out shaft and vice versa. This is owing to a prohibition on a female shaft, from its susceptibility as a receptacle for impurity, for use as s'chach.

18th-century dictionaries and encyclopedias mention male and female screws or cochleae. A 1736 builder's manual mentions screw genders as metaphors for convex and concave shapes:

If the furrowed surface be convex, 'tis called a Male Screw; if concave, a Female; and where Motion is to be generated, the Male and Female are always join'd.

== Mechanical fasteners ==
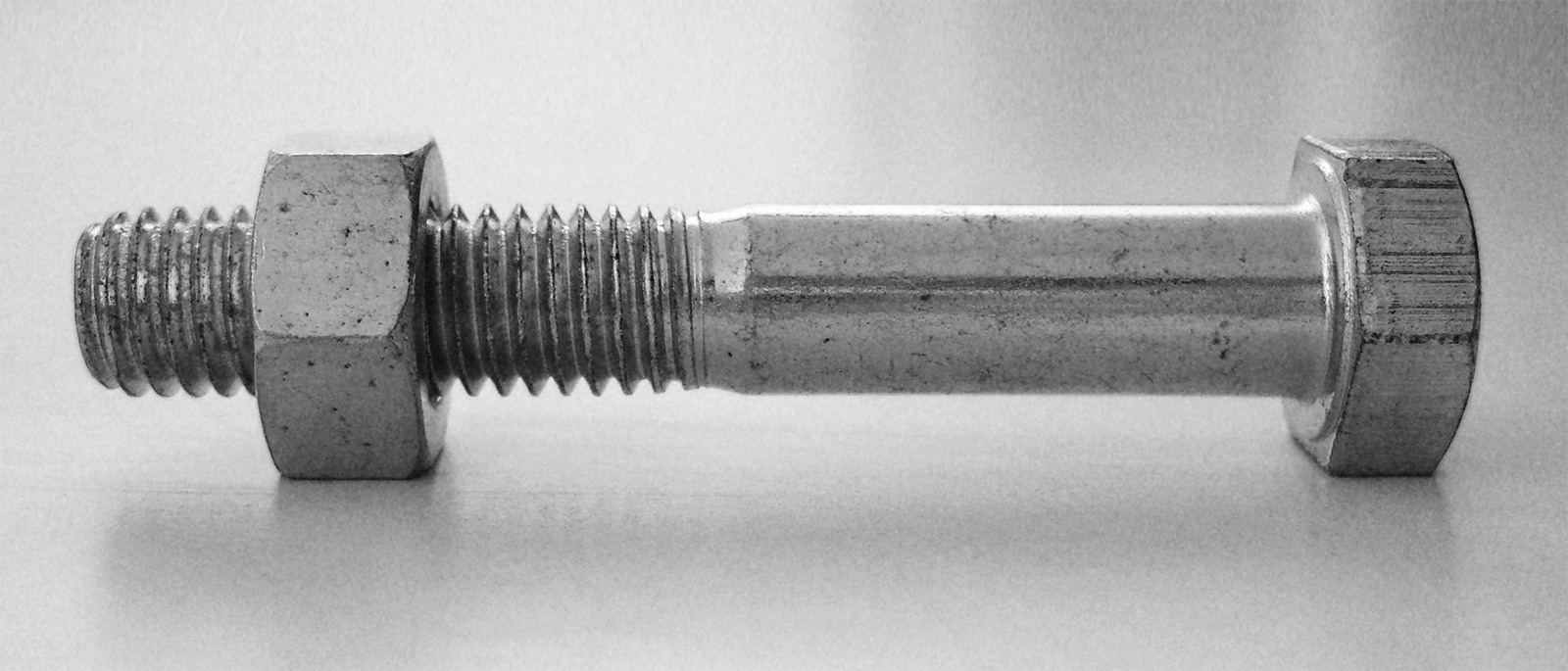
Female nut threaded onto a male bolt

In mechanical design, the prototypical male component is a threaded bolt, but an alignment post, a mounting boss, or a sheet metal tab connector can also be considered as male. Correspondingly, a threaded nut, an alignment hole, a mounting recess, or sheet metal slot connector is considered to be female.

While some mechanical designs are one-time custom setups not intended to be repeated, there is an entire fastener industry devoted to manufacturing mass-produced or semi-custom components. To avoid unnecessary confusion, conventional definitions of fastener gender have been defined and agreed upon.

== Modular construction toys ==
Lego toy brick connections are female underneath, and male on top

Several common construction toys embody gendered (and in some cases, genderless) mechanical interconnections. For example, the canonical Lego plastic blocks have female indentations on the lower surface and male bosses, or protrusions, on the upper surfaces. Meccano and Erector have many gendered connections, starting with the nut-and-bolt fasteners they use frequently.

Stickle bricks, using interlocking plastic protrusions, are effectively genderless (while nonetheless maintaining an asymmetry). Lincoln logs use a very simple form of genderless connections. Kapla or KEVA planks are extremely simple genderless systems interconnected only by gravity.

Mathematicians have begun to classify well-known construction sets using group theory to study the combinatoric possibilities of structures that can be built.

== Plumbing ==
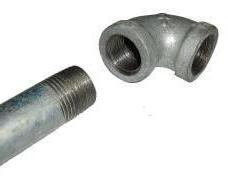
Left: A male threaded pipe, Right: a female threaded elbow

In plumbing fittings, the M or F usually comes at the beginning rather than the end of the abbreviated designation. For example:

- MIPT denotes male iron pipe thread;
- FIPT denotes female iron pipe thread.

A short length of pipe having an MIP thread at both ends is sometimes called a nipple. A short pipe fitting having an FIP thread at both ends is sometimes called a coupling.

Hermaphroditic connections, which may include both male and female elements in a single unit, are used for some specialized tubing fittings, such as Storz fire hose connectors. A picture of such fittings appears in § Genderless (hermaphroditic), below. Interchangeable garden hose fittings made by GEKA are also hermaphroditic, relying on a rubber gasket to make the final connection.

== Downspout ==
Downspouts (also called downpipes, rain conductors, or leaders) are used to convey rainwater from roof gutters to the ground through hollow pipes or tubes. These tubes usually come in sections, joined by inserting the male end (often crimped with a special tool to slightly reduce its size) into the female end of the next section. These connections are usually not sealed or caulked, instead relying on gravity to move the rainwater from the male end and into the receiving female connection located directly below.

== Ductwork ==
Sheet metal ductwork for conveying air in HVAC systems typically uses gendered connections. Typically, the airflow through a ductwork connection is from male to female. However, connections formed opposite to this convention can be seen in some systems, since all connections are typically sealed with duct sealing mastic or tape to prevent leakage anyway. The flow convention is usually loosely adhered to for simplicity of design and to reduce the number of gender changer fittings required, but exceptions are made whenever expedient.

== Electrical and electronic ==
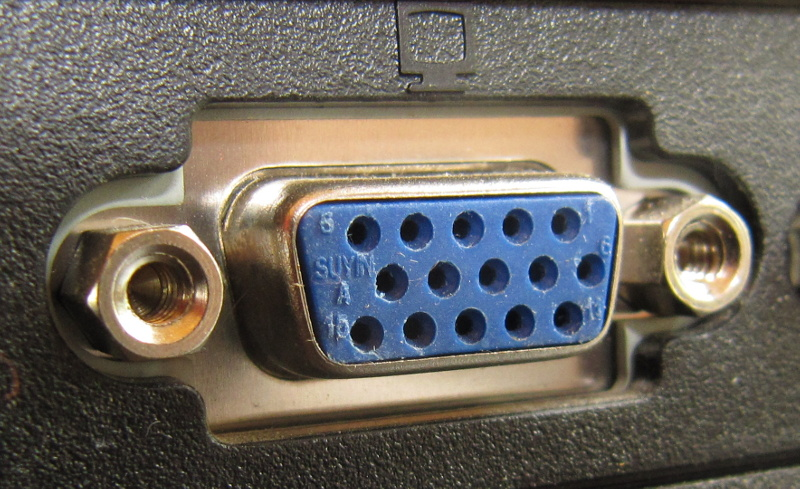
Female VGA connector

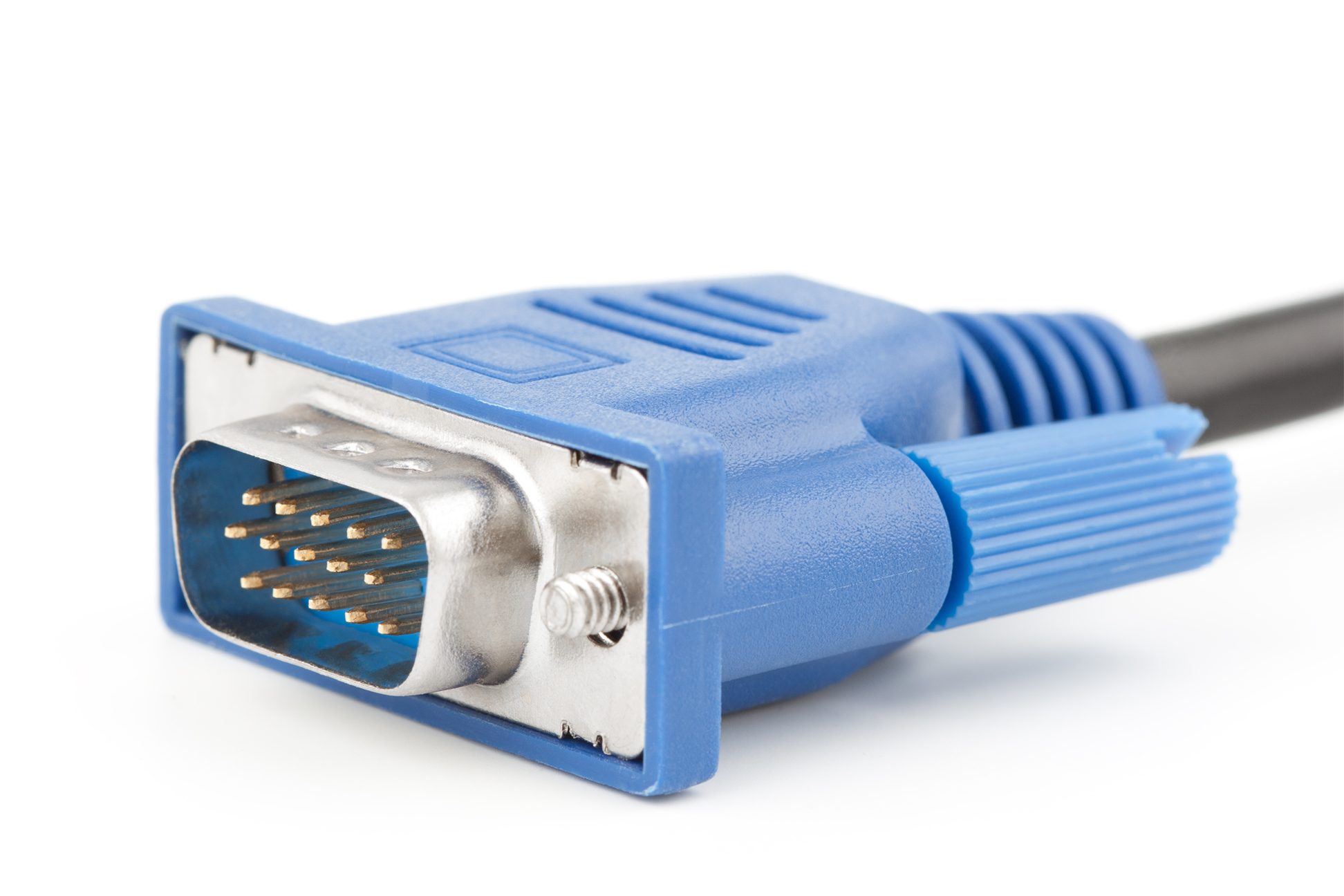
Male VGA connector

Gender of electrical connectors is defined by the conductive pins.

Although the gender of tubing and plumbing fittings is usually obvious, this may not be true of electrical connectors because of their more complex and varying constructions. Instead, connector gender is conventionalized and thus can be somewhat obscure to the uninitiated. For example, the female D-subminiature connector body projects outward from the mounting plane of the chassis, and this protrusion could be erroneously construed as male. Instead, the gender is determined by the innermost part, the male pins, rather than by the protrusion of the connector that fits inside the shield of the mating connector. (This is also true for many other pin-based connectors, like XLR). The distinction is more obvious with ring crimp lug connectors which are placed around a screw post, but again with spade or split ring crimp lug connectors the end alone is not obviously female.

Further confusion can be caused by the term jack, which is used for both female and male connectors and typically refers to the fixed (panel) side of a connector pair. IEEE STD 100, IEEE-315-1975 and IEEE 200-1975 (replaced by ASME Y14.44-2008) define plug and jack by location or mobility, rather than gender.

A connector in a fixed location is a jack, and a moveable connector is a plug. The distinction is relative, so a portable radio is considered stationary compared to the cable from the headphones; the radio has a jack, and the headphone cable has a plug. Where the relationship is equal, such as when two flexible cables are connected (an inline connection), each is considered a plug. Jacks use the reference designator prefix of J and plugs use the reference designator prefix of P.

It is common practice to use female connectors for jacks, so the informal gender-based usage often happens to agree with the functional description of the technical standards. However, this is not always the case; often-seen exceptions include a computer's AC Power Inlet and EIA232 DE9 Serial Port, or the male coaxial power jacks for connecting external power adapters to portable equipment.

To summarize, it is considered best practice to use male and female for connector gender, and plug and jack for connector function or mobility.

=== Variant usages ===
In the United Kingdom, many Commonwealth countries, and some non-English-speaking countries, such as France, the word jack may refer to the plug on the end of a removable cable. These connectors were originally referred to as jack plugs, or plugs intended to be mated with fixed receptacles, or sockets (which North Americans call jacks), but the second word was dropped. This variant usage is in direct contradiction to common usage and official standards in North America.

For example, in the UK, the connector on the end of a headphone lead is known as a jack that plugs into a socket on the main unit. The same usage also generally occurs in Italy, where the English word jack is commonly used to indicate the connector on the end of a headphone lead.

=== Abbreviations and alternate terminology ===
The letters M and F are commonly used in part numbers to designate connector gender. For example, in Switchcraft XLR microphone or hydrophone connectors, the part numbers are denoted as follows:

- A3F = Audio 3-pin female connector;
- A3M = Audio 3-pin male connector.

The terms plug, pin, and prong are also often used for male connectors, and receptacle, socket, and slot are used for female connectors. In many cases these terms are more common than male and female, especially in documentation intended for the non-specialist. These nearly synonymous terms can cause a fair amount of confusion when the designations are shortened in labels.

For example, a female high-density D-subminiature connector with a size 1 shell can be named DE15F or DE15S (see accompanying pictures). Both terms mean the same thing but could be construed to be completely different items. Similarly, a male standard-density D-sub with a size 1 shell can be named DE9M or DE9P; a female standard-density D-sub with a size 2 shell can be named DA15F or DA15S; a male high-density D-sub with a size 3 shell can be named DB44M or DB44P; and so forth.

Male and female electrical connectors

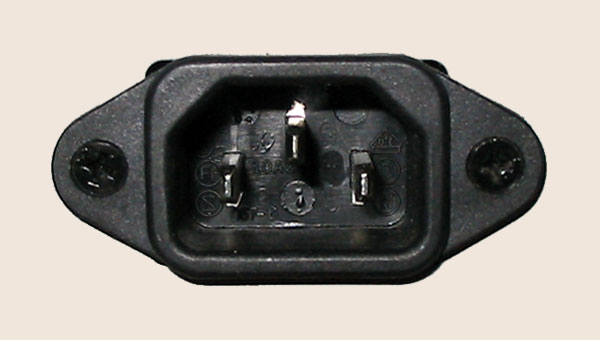
A panel-mounted IEC 60320 C14 male connector jack designed to accept AC line power

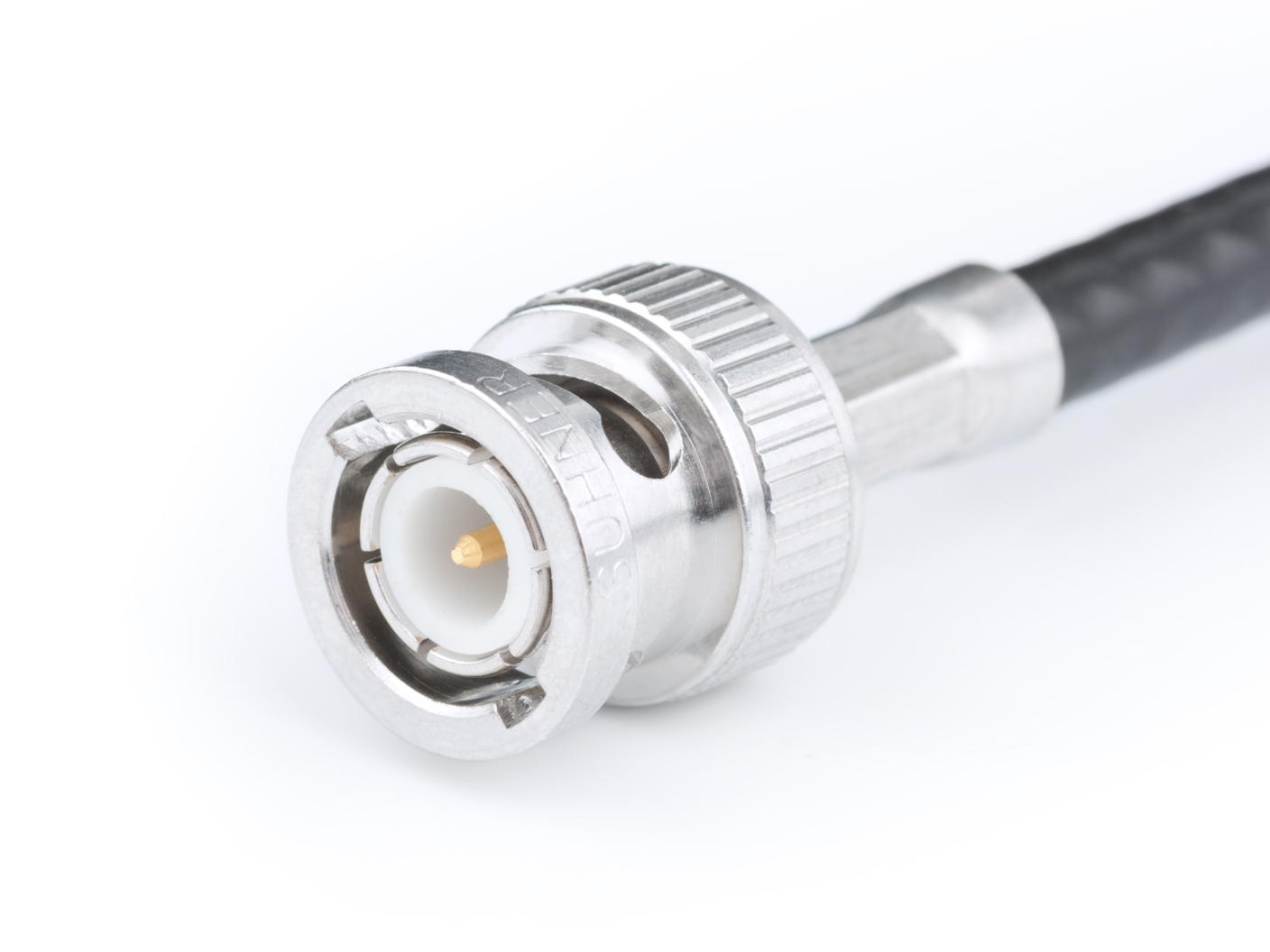
A male 50 ohm BNC connector plug. Three circular projections (including the central pin) interlock with two rings of the female jack.

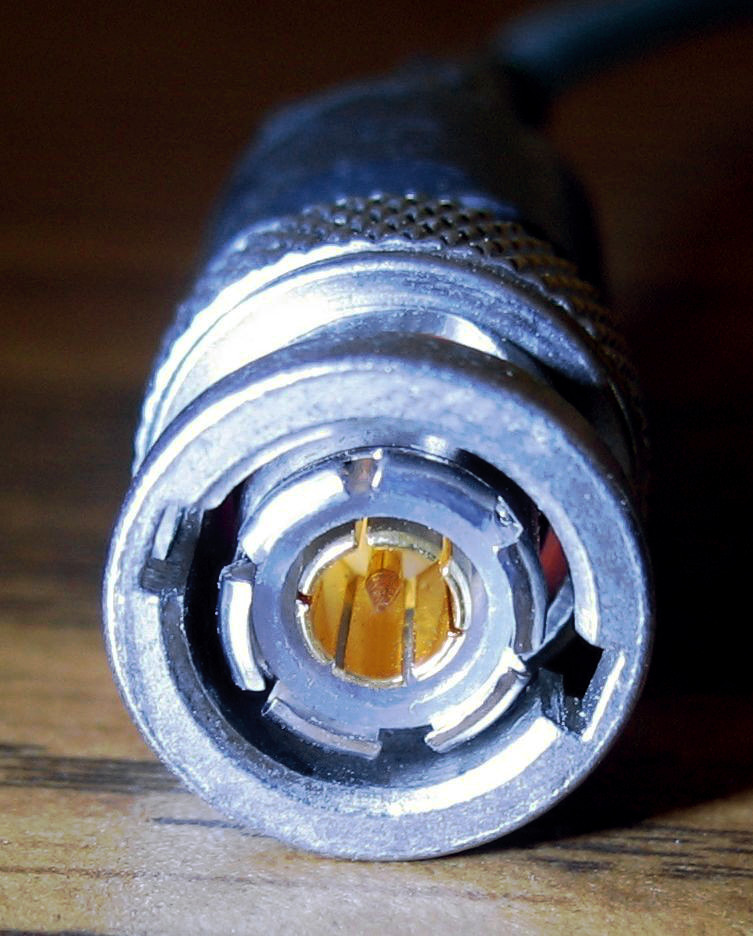
Triaxial BNC connector, a male plug

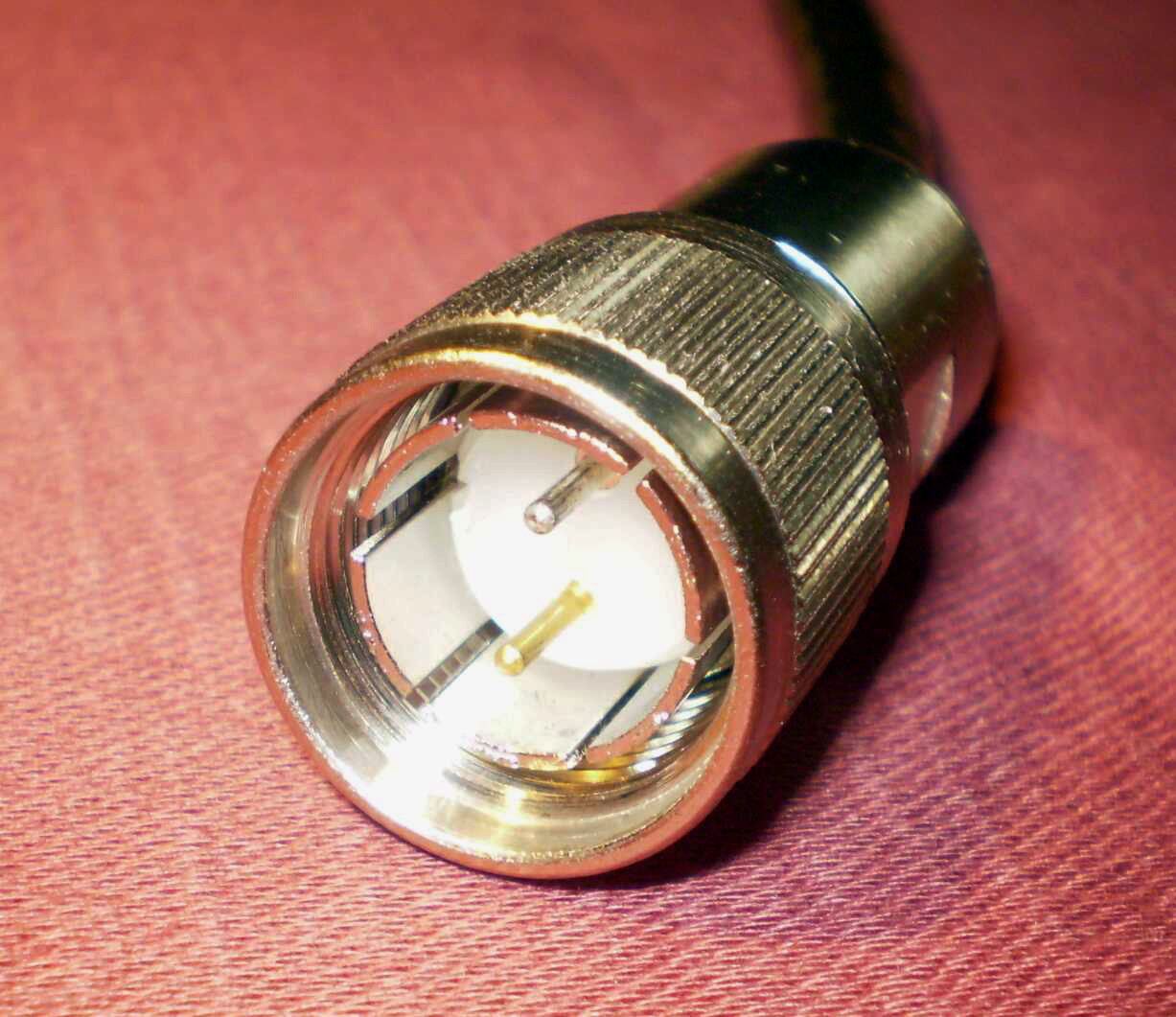
Twinaxial cable connector, a male plug

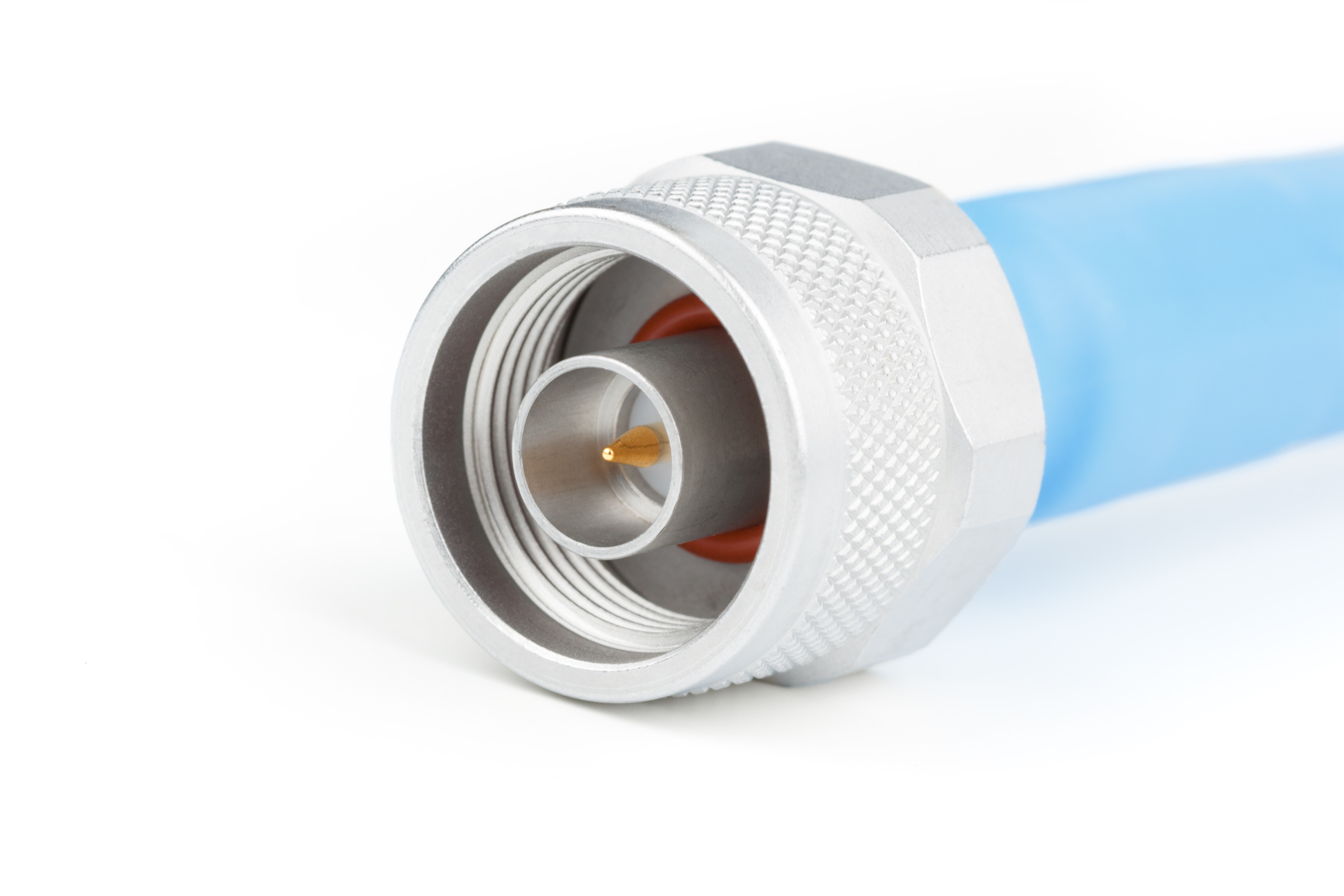
Coaxial Type N connector, a male plug

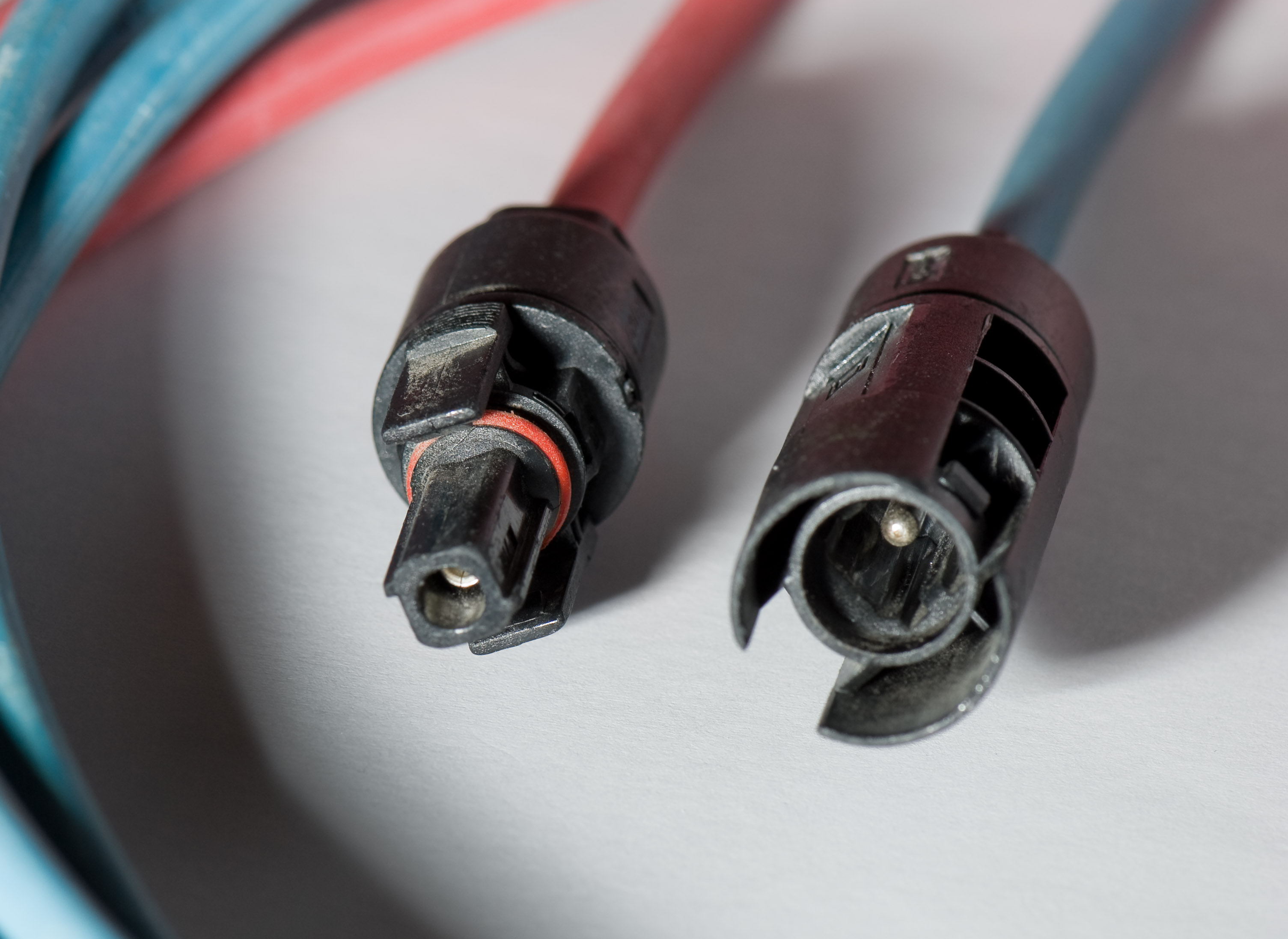
Female (left) and male weatherproof plugs for photovoltaic solar panels

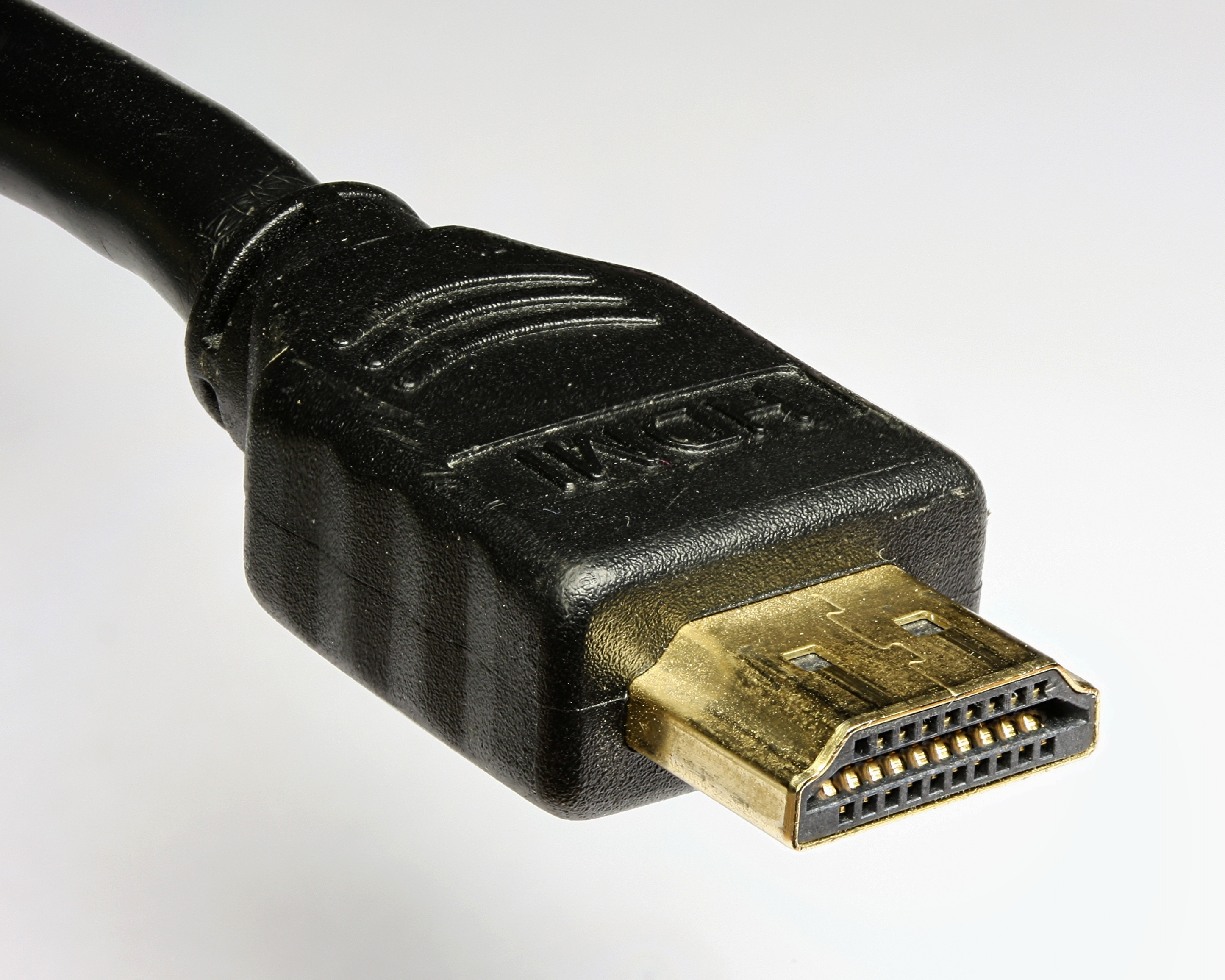
This HDMI plug is conventionally assigned to male gender

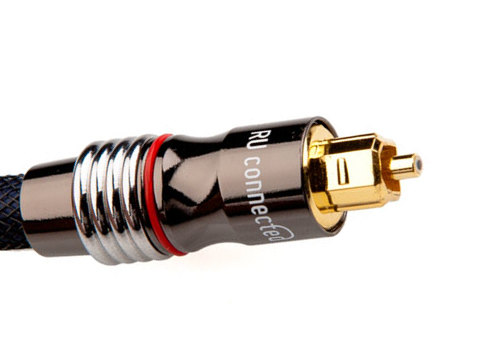
Toslink male plug optical fiber connector

=== Gender selection in electronic design ===
Electronic designers often select female jack connectors for fixed mounting on electronic equipment they design. This is usually done because female connectors are more resistant to damage or contamination, by virtue of their concealed or recessed electrical contacts. A damaged motherboard connector can result in the scrapping of an expensive piece of electronic equipment. The risk of damage is reduced by relegating the more exposed male contacts to connecting cables, which can be repaired or replaced at lower cost.

For example, in an RS-232 serial port, the male connector is more mechanically fragile than the female connector. Cost and reliability considerations probably drove the design decision to use female jack connectors on many computer terminals (and some personal computers) for the serial port, despite being in direct violation of the connector gender convention explicitly specified in the RS-232 standard for DTE (data terminal equipment) connections. This confusing reversal of the RS-232 connector gender convention has caused many hours of frustration for ill-informed end users, as they tried to troubleshoot non-functional serial port equipment connections.

=== Safety ===
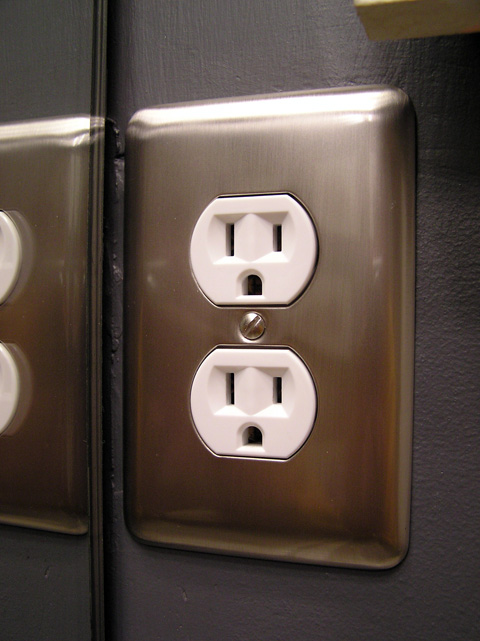
Electrical power outlets are female for safety.

In electrical connections where voltage or current is sufficient to cause injury, the part permanently connected to the power source is invariably female, with concealed contacts, to prevent inadvertent touching of live conductors by people or animals, or by conductive items that may cause a short circuit. A male plug, with fully exposed protruding contacts, is installed on the cord of (or directly onto) the device receiving the power. Devices that need to both prevent users from touching live conductors and protect against damage may use recessed male connectors, such as an IEC 60320 C14 (see the gallery above).

In the case of consumer-level AC power, connector gender is used to implicitly enforce safe use of power connectors. Because of this consideration, it is illegal under electrical code to make or use any gender changers to connect AC line power to consumer-level equipment.

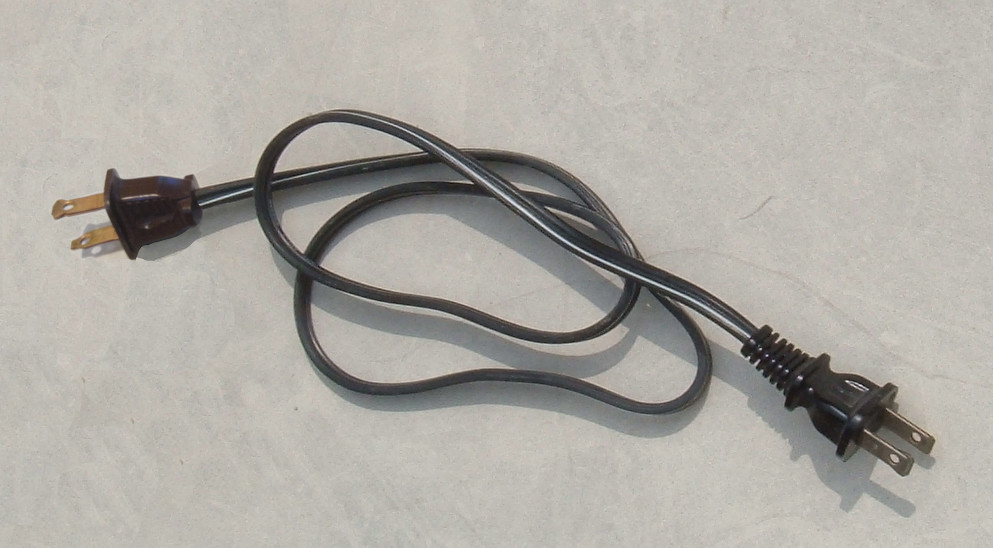
A dangerous double-ended male connector, known as a "suicide cable"

A double-ended male connector for utility-supplied (mains) electrical power is extremely dangerous, and sometimes is called a "suicide cable" or "widowmaker cord". Some hardware shops explicitly refuse to make or sell them when asked by customers who have mistakenly hung a string of Christmas lights backwards and wish to connect the socket end to a wall socket, or who intend to connect a generator or inverter to their home's electrical circuit in the event of a utility power outage. The exposed prongs on the live end of the cable pose serious electrical shock and fire hazards, and when improperly used in a generator setup may cause the equipment to burn out when utility power is restored. It can also backfeed power into the grid, potentially damaging utility equipment or even electrocuting linemen attempting to restore power.

Similarly, an exposed connection on a jumper cable for a 12V automotive battery can be hazardous, because of the potentially high current and energy involved. Accidental shorting of the wire to vehicle ground can cause sparks, rapid heating, or even a battery explosion.

In low-voltage use such as for data communications, electrical shock hazard is not an issue, and male or female connectors are used based on other engineering factors such as convenience of use, cost, or ease of manufacturing. For example, the common patch cables used for Ethernet (and the similar cords used for telephones) typically have male modular plugs on both ends, to connect to jacks on equipment or mounted in walls.

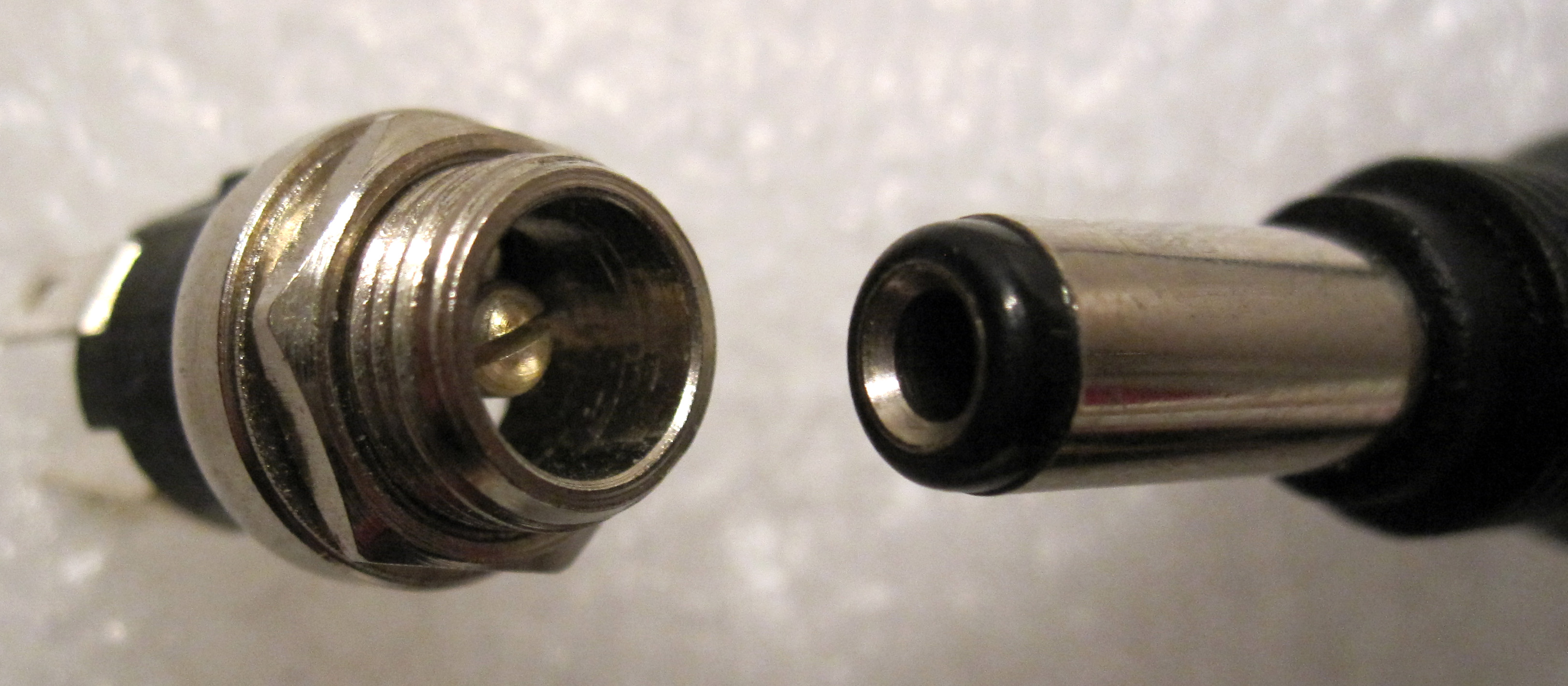
Common 5.5×2.5 mm coaxial power connectors. Power is provided by the female plug on the right to the male jack on the left; the exposed conductors are not hazardous due to the low voltage.

An example of a design tradeoff in power connector selection is a coaxial power connector, which is usually set up so that power is fed from the female plug into the male jack (which is typically a part of the electronic device accepting the power). Although the plug is female, with a partially recessed center contact, it is still possible for casual accidental contact with a metallic object to short-circuit the power source. Depending on the design of the power adapter, it may react to a short circuit by shutting down temporarily, or instead by blowing out an internal safety fuse.

In this example, the marginal reliability of the connector choice was deemed to be acceptable by the equipment designer, since the power adapter supplies low voltage that does not pose an electric shock hazard. The potential fire hazard from accidental short-circuiting is addressed by the internal safety fuse, although this requires that a failed power adapter be completely replaced. In a different design, if the power adapter were intended to supply a voltage sufficient to cause electrical shock, the semi-exposed center contact of the female plug would be considered unacceptably hazardous, requiring a different choice of connector.

=== Ambiguous gender ===
Some electrical connectors are hermaphroditic because they include both male and female elements in a single unit intended to interconnect freely, without regard for gender. See the discussion of genderless connectors in this article for more detailed information.

As an additional complication, certain electronic connector designs may incorporate combinations of male and female pins in a single connector body, for mating with a complementary connector with opposite gender pins in corresponding positions. For example, the CEE 7/5 socket has a male earth pin. In these unusual cases, gender is often defined by the shape of the connector body rather than the mixed-gender connector pins and sockets. These types of connectors are not strictly speaking hermaphroditic, since mating connectors are not freely interchangeable. An informal term that has been used for these connectors is bisexual in addition to the more official terminology mixed-gender. Thus, for example, one can have a mixed-gender female plug that connects to a mixed-gender male jack (though a reversed gender assignment of connectors would be a more typical design choice in this example).

Male connector pins are often protected by a shell (also called a shroud, surround, or shield), which may envelop the entire female connector when mated. RF connectors often have multiple layers of interlocking shells to properly connect the shields of coaxial and triaxial cable. In such cases, the gender is assigned based on the innermost connecting point. With the exception of reverse polarity BNC or TNC, where the outer shell determines the gender and the innermost connecting points are opposite to a standard connector, for example a female RP-TNC connector has a solid innermost pin.

Another ambiguous situation arises with the connectors used for USB, FireWire (IEEE-1394), HDMI, and Thunderbolt serial data bus connections. Close examination of these connectors reveals that the contact "pins" are not actually pins but, instead, conductive surfaces that slide past each other when they mate. Therefore, the conventional pin and socket nomenclature is not applicable. Instead, most computer hardware people fall back to referring to the wrap-around metal shield on the plug connector as if it were a connector pin. By this convention, the connectors on serial bus cables are "male plugs", and the corresponding connectors on equipment are "female jacks".

A casual glance at a USB Type-A plug may give the false impression that it is hermaphroditic. However, an attempt to mate two USB Type-A plugs reveals the fact that the connectors cannot connect. Classifying according to mathematical graph theory, USB buses are directed trees, whereas FireWire buses have a true bus network topology. This difference is reflected in the bus connectors used, in that USB cables are asymmetrical (one end Type-A, other end Type-B) while FireWire cables may have identical connectors at both ends. The more-recent USB-C cables may also have identical connectors on both ends (in which case the logical A and B ends are negotiated between the attached devices rather than being directly indicated by the plugs).

An example of a connector where the contacts themselves are hermaphroditic is the ELCO Varicon, wherein the contacts are bifurcated in recessed cross-shaped wells and mate with one another axially at a 90 degree rotation. In this example, the plugs have the contacts oriented transversely and the sockets are arranged longitudinally.

== Genderless (hermaphroditic) ==
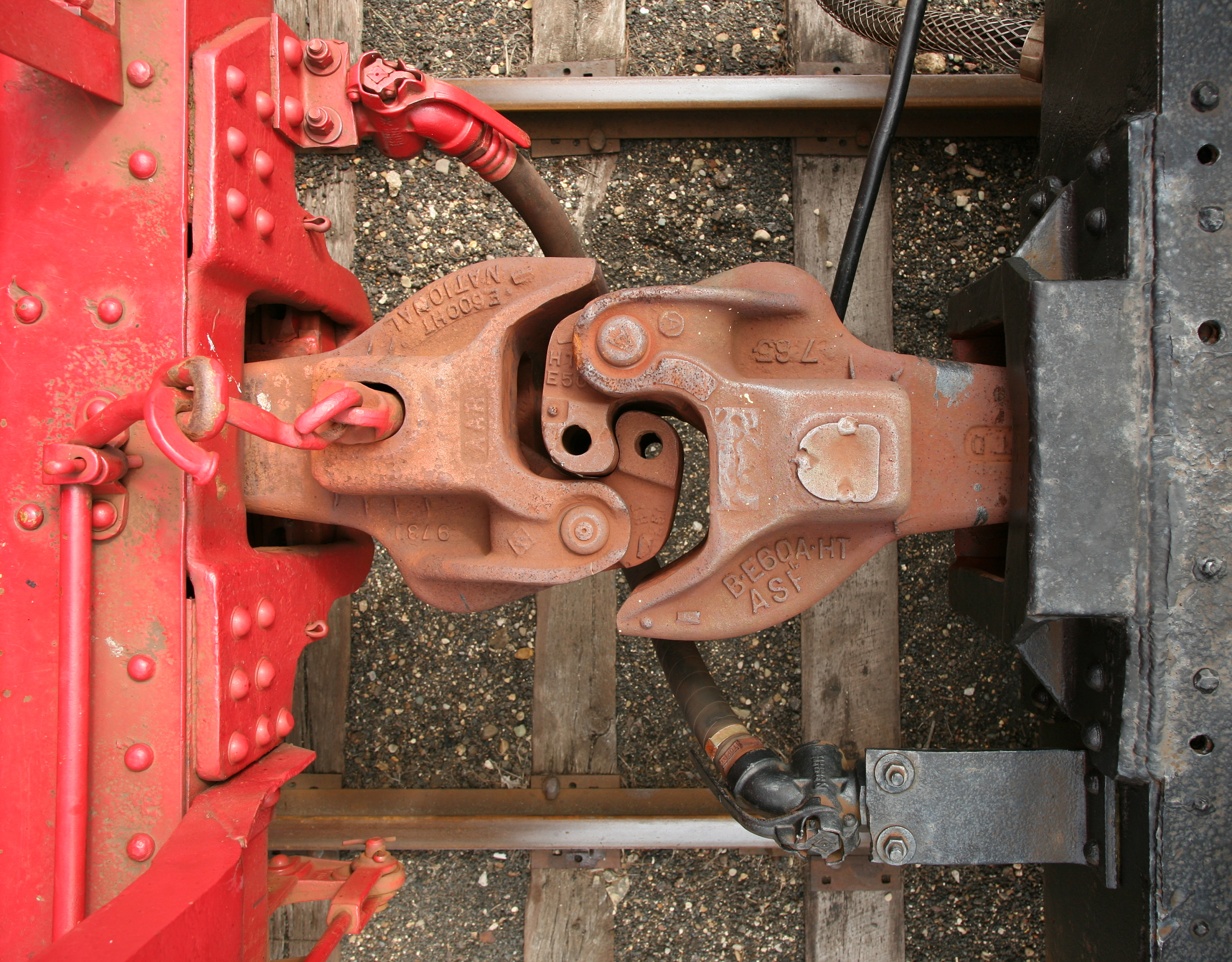
Paired knuckle-type hermaphroditic mechanical couplers for railcars (viewed from above, looking down at the tracks)

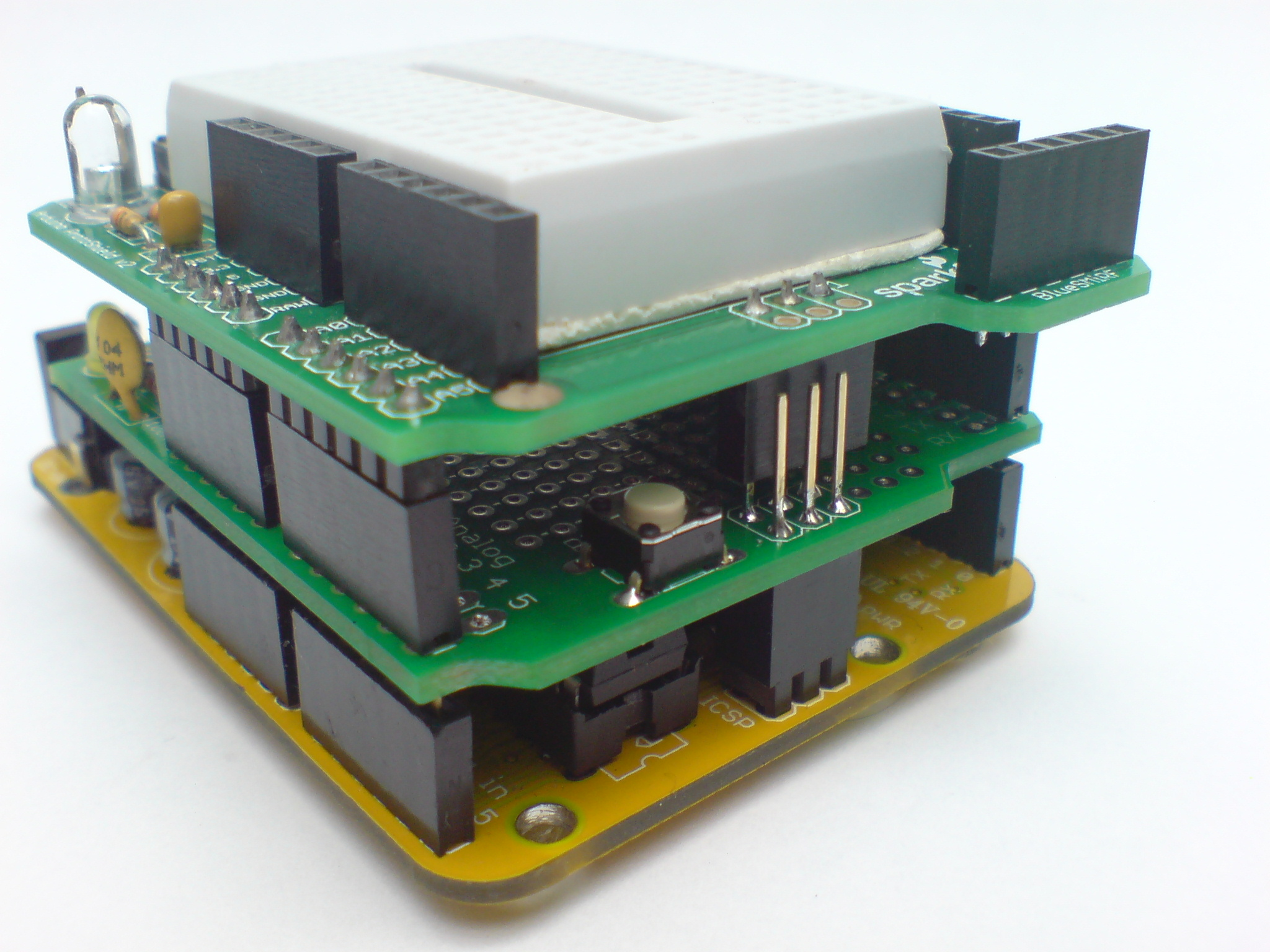
Arduino shield boards connected via stackable bus connectors

By definition, a hermaphroditic connector includes mating surfaces having simultaneous male and female aspects, involving complementary paired identical parts each containing both protrusions and indentations. These mating surfaces are mounted into identical fittings which can freely mate with any other, without regard for gender (provided that the size and type are already matched). Alternative names include hermaphrodite, androgynous, genderless, sexless, combination (or combo), two-in-one, two-way, and other descriptive terms. Several of these latter alternate names are ambiguous in meaning, and should not be used unless carefully defined in context. True hermaphroditic connectors should not be confused with mixed gender connectors, which are described elsewhere in this article.

Another closely related type is the stackable connector for electronics, which typically has male pins on one surface and complementary female sockets on the opposite surface, allowing multiple units to be stacked up like plastic milk crates. Examples of this include stackable banana plugs, and interconnect cables specified for the IEEE-488 instrumentation bus. Stackable mezzanine bus connectors are used on some modular microcomputer accessory boards for systems such as the Arduino add-on daughterboards called shields. The older PC/104 embedded PC modules use a similar stackable format for interconnection. Stackable connectors are not classified as hermaphroditic in the strictest sense, but are often described as such in looser usage.

The hermaphroditic design is useful when multiple complex or lengthy components must be arbitrarily connected in various combinations. For example, if hoses have hermaphroditic fittings, they can be connected without having to pull a lengthy hose and reverse it because it has the wrong gender to connect to another hose. Some military fiber optical cables also have hermaphroditic connectors to prevent connector-gender-mismatch problems in field deployments. In a similar fashion, railcars are usually equipped with hermaphroditic railway coupling mechanisms that allow either end of the vehicle to be connected to a train without having to turn the railcar around first. For the same reason, several spacecraft docking mechanisms are designed to be androgynous, including the Androgynous Peripheral Attach System, the NASA Docking System, and Chinese Docking Mechanism.

In the absence of genderless connectors, gender changer fittings might be used to enable certain connections. The designer of a connection system may use one or both schemes to allow arbitrary connectivity, or even combine both schemes into a single system.

When an enforced sense of unidirectionality is required for safety or other reasons (for example, AC electrical mains power connections), a strict assignment of connector genders is implemented to prevent dangerous configurations, and gender changers are banned.

Some commonly seen examples of hermaphroditic connectors include the SAE connector for 12 V DC power, gladhands and other pneumatic hose couplings, and the Anderson Powerpole series of modular high-current power connectors. The now-obsolete IBM Token Ring connector was another widespread example. The General Radio Corporation developed a hermaphroditic coaxial radio-frequency connector often called the GR connector.

Some audio multicore cables are fitted with hermaphroditic multipin quick-disconnect connectors for ease of use in the field. One style of this audio signal cable is fitted on both ends with connectors that are each populated half with pins and half with sockets. The advantage to the user is that it does not matter which end connects to the stage and which to the audio mixer, facilitating faster set up. Another style of connector uses hybrid male/female pins with a receiving slot fitted in the center of each two-tine pin, and relies on 90-degree rotation of the pin axes to mate. The connector housings themselves are sexed male and female.

Genderless connectors
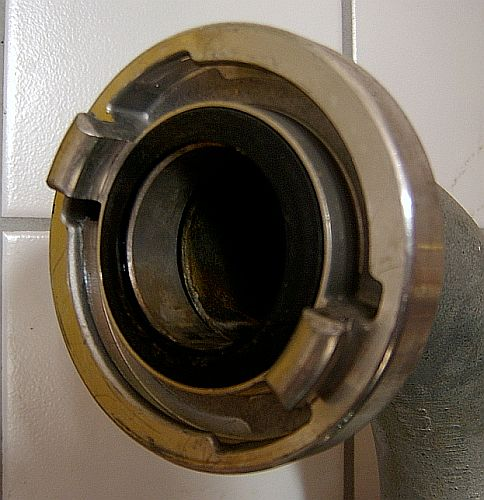
Hermaphroditic Storz fire hose connector

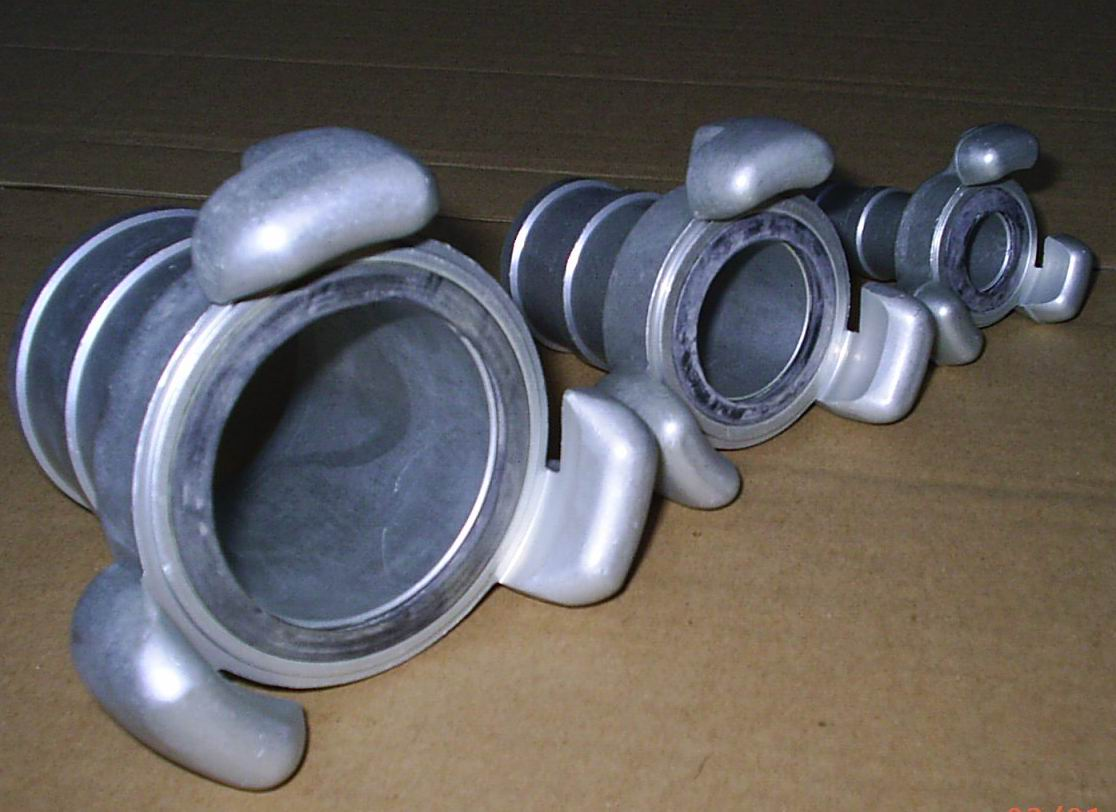
Hermaphroditic, or genderless, claw-type hose connectors

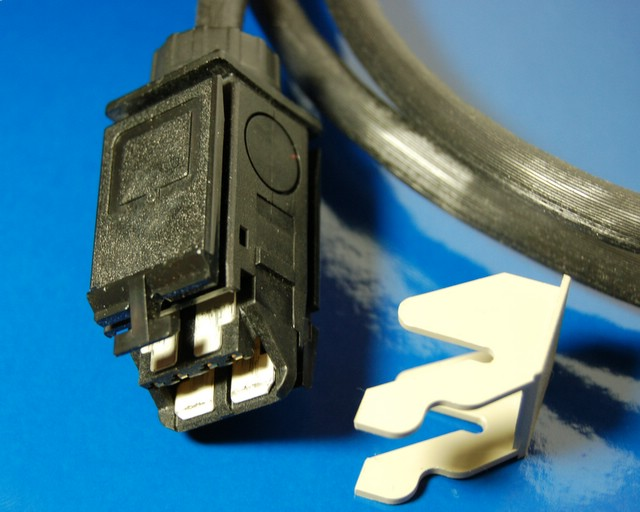
IBM Token Ring hermaphroditic connector with locking clip

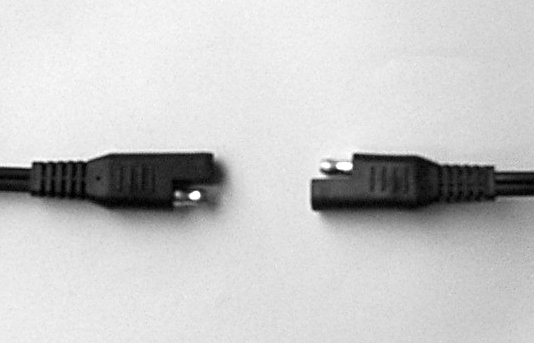
SAE hermaphroditic connector used for 12 V DC power

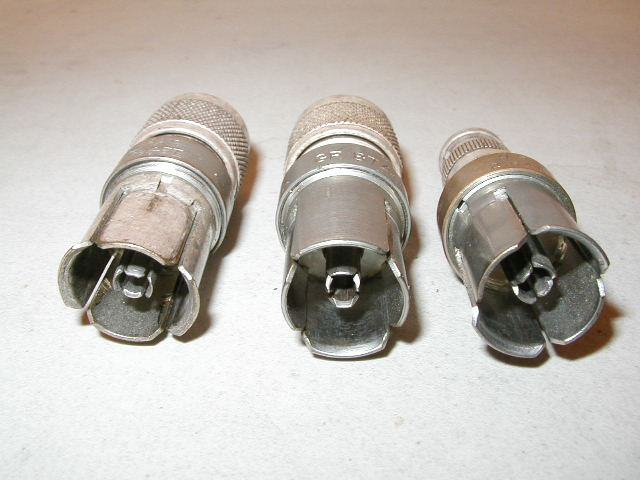
General Radio GR-874 hermaphroditic coaxial RF connector

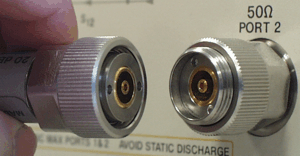
APC-7 coaxial RF connector

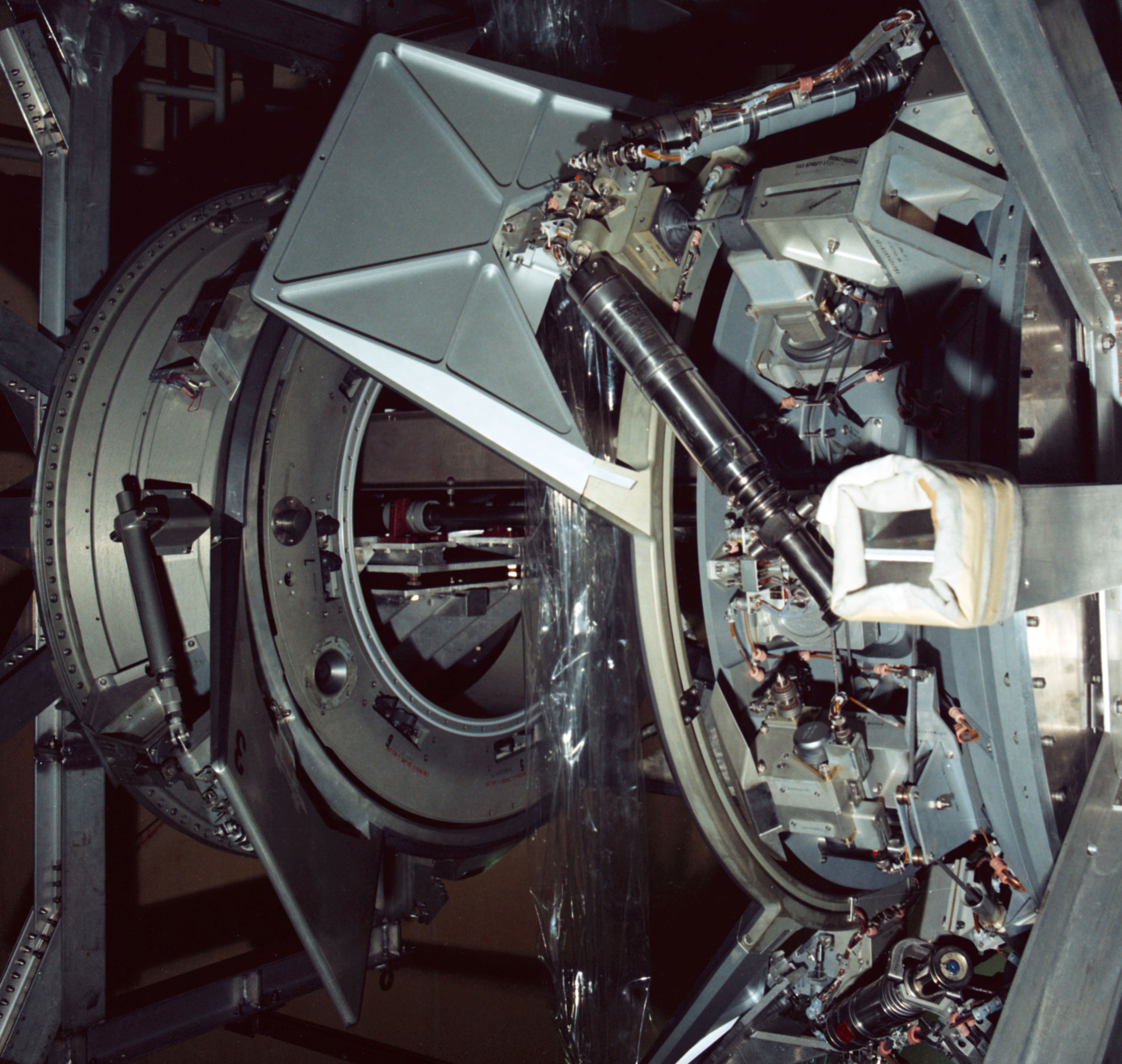
Androgynous Peripheral Attach System spacecraft docking mechanism

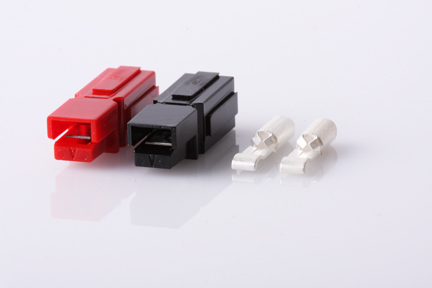
Anderson Powerpole 15-, 30-, and 45-ampere genderless housings and contacts

== Gender changers ==
Devices used for mating two connectors of the same gender and referred to by a wide variety of terms, including, for example: gender changer, gender mender, gender bender, and gender blender. A specific gender changer can be referred to by either the gender of its connectors, or the gender which it is designed to connect to, resulting in a thoroughly ambiguous terminology. Thus a male gender changer might have female connectors to mate two male ends, or male connectors to mate two female ends.

Adding to this potential for confusion, some gender changers also combine additional functions such as cross-over conductor assignments. Active cables may incorporate embedded systems for communications protocol or logic level changes, which technically makes them adapters, but this distinction is sometimes neglected in marketing materials or common usage.

Gender changers
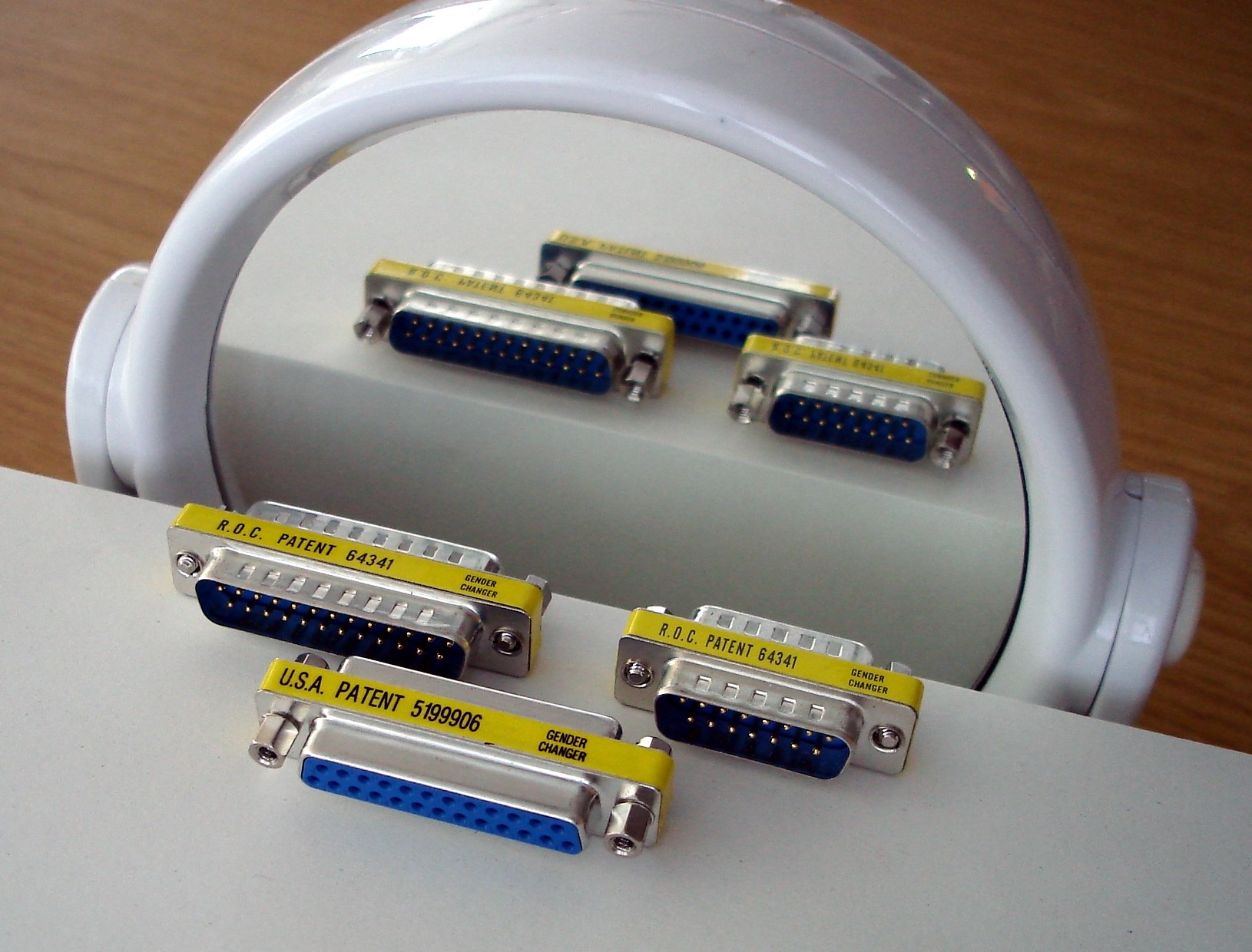
DA15 and DB25 D-subminiature gender changers

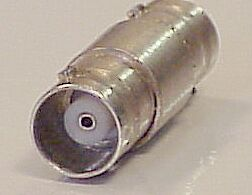
A female to female BNC connector

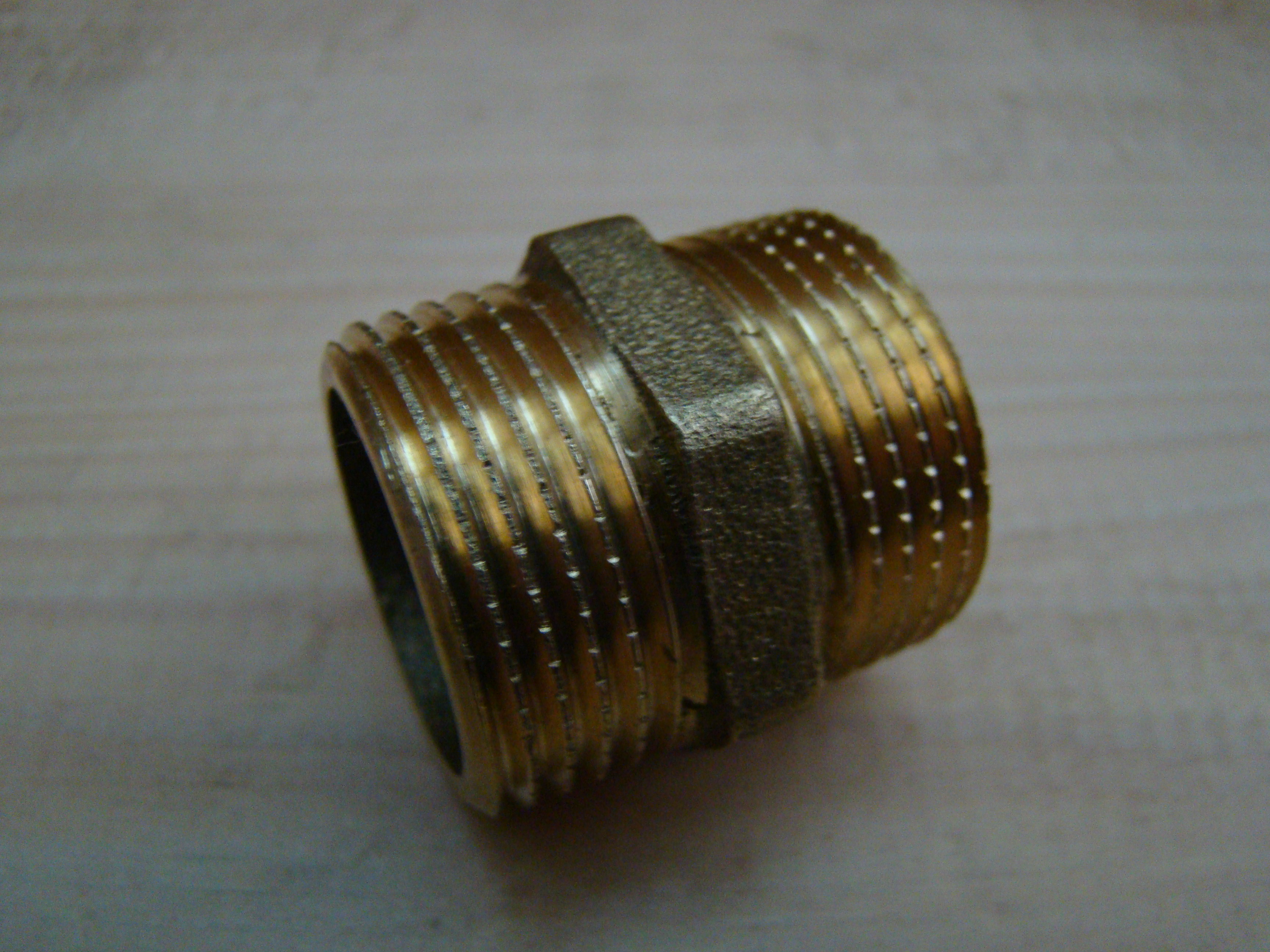
Pipe nipple male to male threaded pipe coupling

== Examples ==
- Coaxial power connector, for low-voltage DC connections
- A power cord on an appliance terminates in a (male) plug; it connects to a (female) socket in a wall or on an extension cord.
- Coaxial cables used for video or other high-frequency signals are normally terminated, at both ends, in a connector comprising an inner pin and an outer fixed or rotating shell; these are conventionally reckoned as male.
- A threaded nut is female and a bolt is male.
- Connectors for air brake hoses on heavy trucks and railroad equipment use genderless gladhand connectors. In railroad air brake use, this makes the orientation of rolling stock irrelevant, and is used with the standard North American railroad coupler that connects cars together, also genderless.

== See also ==
- Mating connection
- Piping and plumbing fittings
- Screw thread
- Sex bolt
- Twistlock – standardized fasteners for shipping containers
