= Mating connection =

A mating connection is any method of assembling of two or more component parts with mutually complementing shapes that, with some imagination, resembles the way two animals, male and female, are physically connected during the act of mating. In such connections one of the two components acts as male and the other as female, although more complex relationships exist. Any electrical connector, bolted joint, and jigsaw puzzle is an example of assembling based on mating connection.

== See also ==
- Gender of connectors and fasteners
