= Reference designator =

Location identifier for a circuit component

Joule thief schematic showing reference designators: C1, C2, D1, D2, R1, R2, Q1, Q2, U1, U2, BAT1, XFMR1 (not preferred designator).

A reference designator (RefDes) unambiguously identifies the location of a component within an electrical schematic or on a printed circuit board. The reference designator usually consists of one or two letters followed by a number, e.g. C3, D1, R4, U15. The number is sometimes followed by a letter, indicating that components are grouped or matched with each other, e.g. R17A, R17B.

The IEEE 315 standard contains a list of Class Designation Letters to use for electrical and electronic assemblies. For example, the letter R is a reference prefix for the resistors of an assembly, C for capacitors, K for relays. Industrial electrical installations often use reference designators according to IEC 81346 and NFPA 79 Annex E: Device and Component Designations.

== History ==
IEEE 200-1975 or "Standard Reference Designations for Electrical and Electronics Parts and Equipments" is a standard that was used to define referencing naming systems for collections of electronic equipment. IEEE 200 was ratified in 1975. The IEEE renewed the standard in the 1990s, but withdrew it from active support shortly thereafter. This document also has an ANSI document number, ANSI Y32.16-1975.

This standard codified information from, among other sources, a United States military standard MIL-STD-16 which dates back to at least the 1950s in American industry.

To replace IEEE 200-1975, ASME, a standards body for mechanical engineers, initiated the new standard ASME Y14.44-2008. This standard, along with IEEE 315-1975, provide the electrical designer with guidance on how to properly reference and annotate everything from a single circuit board to a collection of complete enclosures.

== Definition ==
ASME Y14.44-2008 and IEEE 315-1975 define how to reference and annotate components of electronic devices.

It breaks down a system into units, and then any number of sub-assemblies. The unit is the highest level of demarcation in a system and is always a numeral. Subsequent demarcation are called assemblies and always have the Class Letter "A" as a prefix following by a sequential number starting with 1. Any number of sub-assemblies may be defined until finally reaching the component. Note that IEEE 315-1975 defines separate class designation letters for separable assemblies (class designation 'A') and inseparable assemblies (class designation 'U'). Inseparable assemblies—i.e., "items which are ordinarily replaced as a single item of supply"—are typically treated as components in this referencing scheme.

Examples:

- 1A12A2R3 - Unit 1, Assembly 12, Sub-assembly 2, Resistor 3
- 1A12A2U3 - Unit 1, Assembly 12, Sub-assembly 2, Inseparable Assembly 3

Especially valuable is the method of referencing and annotating cables plus their connectors within and outside assemblies. Examples:

- 1A1A44J5 - Unit 1, Assembly 1, Sub-Assembly 44, Jack 5 (J5 is a connector on a box referenced as A44)
- 1A1A45J333 - Unit 1, Assembly 1, Sub-Assembly 45, Jack 333 (J333 is a connector on a box referenced as A45)

A cable connecting these two might be:

- 1A1W35 - In the assembly A1 is a cable called W35.

Connectors on this cable would be designated:

- 1A1W35P1
- 1A1W35P2

ASME Y14.44-2008 continues the convention of Plug P and Jack J when assigning references for electrical connectors in assemblies where a J (or jack) is the more fixed and P (or plug) is the less fixed of a connector pair, without regard to the gender of the connector contacts.

The construction of reference designators is covered by IEEE 200-1975/ANSI Y32.16-1975 (replaced by ASME Y14.44-2008) and IEEE 315-1975.

== Designators ==
The table below lists designators commonly used, and does not necessarily comply with standards. For modern use, designators are often simplified towards shorter designators, because it requires less space on silkscreens.

Designator	Component type	Modern use
A	Separable assembly or sub-assembly (e.g. printed circuit assembly)	
AT	Attenuator or isolator	
BR	Bridge rectifier (four diodes in a package)	often changed to "D" for diode.
BT, BAT	Battery or battery holder	often shortened to "B".
C	Capacitor	
CB	Circuit breaker	
CN	Capacitor network	may be simplified to "C" for capacitor, some people use "CN" for connector.
D, CR	Diode (all types, including LED), thyristor	"D" is preferred for various types of diodes.
DL	Delay line	
DN	Diode network	may be simplified to "D" for diode.
DS	Display, general light source, lamp, signal light	
F	Fuse	
FB	Ferrite bead	sometimes changed to "L" for inductor, though "E" was used in the currently inactive standard IEEE 315 (see Clause 22.4).
FD	Fiducial	
FL	Filter	
G, OSC	Generator or oscillator	
GL	Graphical logo	
GN	General network	
H	Hardware, e.g., screws, nuts, washers, also used for drilled holes	sometimes hardware is expanded to "HW", some people use "H" for header.
HY	Circulator or directional coupler	
IR	Infrared diode	often changed to "D" for diode
J	Jack connector (least-movable connector of a connector pair)	all types of connectors, including pin headers.
JP	Jumper (link)	
K	Relay or contactor	
L	Inductor or coil or ferrite bead	
LD, LED	LED	often changed to "D" for diode.
LS, SPK	Loudspeaker or buzzer	
M	Motor	
MK, MIC	Microphone	
MP	Mechanical part (including screws and fasteners)	
OP	Opto-isolator	often changed to "U" for IC.
P	Plug connector (most-movable connector of a connector pair)	
PD	Photodiode	
Q	Transistor (all types)	
R	Resistor	
RN	Resistor network	sometimes simplified to "R" for resistor, or "N" for network.
RT	Thermistor	sometimes simplified to "R" for resistor.
RV	Varistor, variable resistor	
S	Switch (all types, including buttons)	sometimes "SW" is used.
SA	Spark arrester	
T	Transistor	often changed to "Q", but sometimes "T" is used for bipolar transistors and "Q" for FETs.
TC	Thermocouple	
TP	Test point	
TR, T	Transformer	sometimes changed to "L" for inductor
TUN	Tuner	
U, IC	Integrated circuit (IC)	shorter "U" (unit) is preferred instead of "IC".
U#A, U#B... U#C	Integrated circuit (IC)	where # stands for number; this is used in multi-unit symbols just like "U", but with separate set of connections laid out in different places on the same schematics
V	Vacuum tube	
VR	Voltage regulator (voltage reference), or variable resistor (potentiometer / trimmer / rheostat)	voltage regulators are often "U" for IC, pots and trimmers often "R" for resistor.
X	Socket connector for another item not P or J, paired with the letter symbol for that item (XV for vacuum tube socket, XF for fuse holder, XA for printed circuit assembly connector, XU for integrated circuit connector, XDS for light socket, etc.)	
X, XTAL, Y	Crystal, ceramic resonator, powered oscillator	
ZD	Zener diode	often changed to "D" for diode.

=== Other designators ===
- AE: Aerial, antenna
- ASSY: Separable assembly
- B: Battery
- CN: Connector
- CRT: Cathode ray tube
- DSP: Digital signal processor
- FET: Field-effect transistor
- GDT, SVP: Gas discharge tube, surge voltage protector
- H: Pin header
- J, JW: Wire link ("jumper")
- JFET: Junction gate field-effect transistor
- LA: Lightning arrester
- LCD: Liquid crystal display
- LDR: Light-dependent resistor
- LED: Light-emitting diode
- MCB: Miniature circuit breaker
- MIC: Microphone
- MOSFET: Metal-oxide-semiconductor field-effect transistor
- MOV: Metal-oxide varistor
- NE: Neon lamp
- PCB: Printed circuit board
- PLC: Programmable logic controller
- PU: Pickup
- RY, RLA: Relay
- SCR: Silicon-controlled rectifier
- SUS: Silicon unilateral switch
- SW: Switch
- TFT: Thin-film transistor (display)
- TH: Thermistor
- VC: Variable capacitor
- VDR: Voltage-dependent resistor
- VFD: Vacuum fluorescent display
- VT: Voltage transformer
- W: Wire

== See also ==
- Circuit diagram
- Electronic symbol
- IC power-supply pin
