= Gender changer =

Hardware device

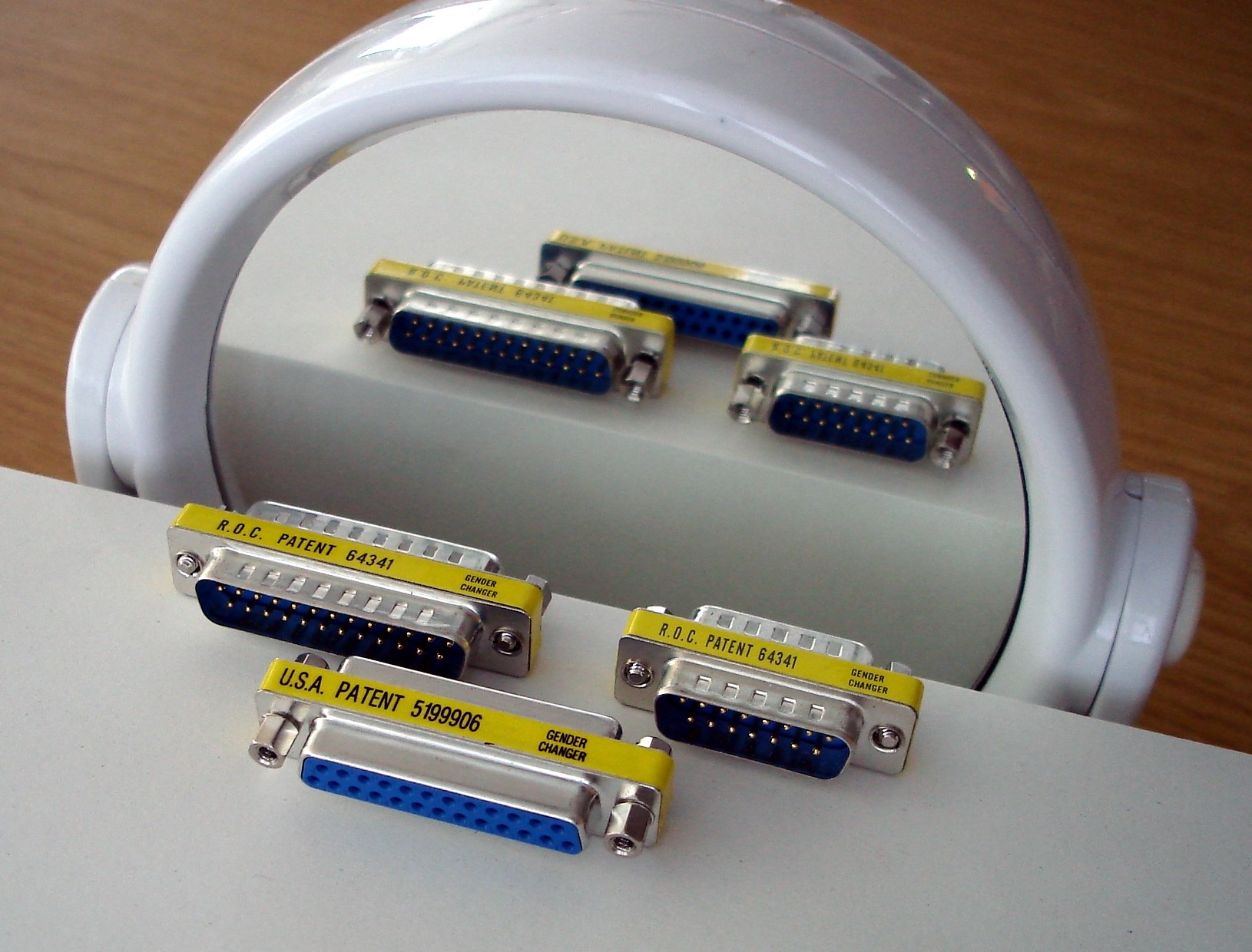
D-subminiature connector gender changers

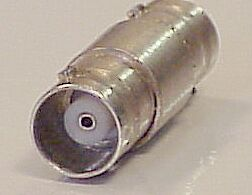
BNC connector female to female gender changer

A gender changer is a hardware device placed between two cable connectors of the same type and gender. An example is a cable connector shell with either two female or two male connectors on it (male-to-male or female-to-female), used to correct the mismatches that result when interconnecting two devices or cables with the same gender of connector.

Gender changers are used for RS-232C ports in either the original DB-25 or the IBM AT DE-9 format. They are also used when extending any sort of cable that normally has plugs on both ends (rather than a socket on one and plug on the other), however in this case it is usually called just an "extender", such as with F connectors, BNC connectors, and various RJ connectors used in telephony and computer networking.

Gender changers are used in professional audio to adapt XLR connectors, RCA connectors, Speakon connectors and TRS phone connectors.

The null modem is a computer communications adapter which may appear to be a gender changer, but it reroutes the wiring. The "transmit" pair from each side is routed into the "receive" pair of the other side, in the manner of a crossover cable.

Many different types of small hardware can be considered gender changers. For instance, there are a variety of small adapters sold for quarter-inch audiovisual cables that serve the role of connecting gendered cables. Other kinds of gender changers are available for coaxial cable, Ethernet cabling or any other type of modern data or audiovisual cables.

== See also ==
- Gender of connectors and fasteners
