= APC-7 connector =

Precision coaxial connector

APC-7
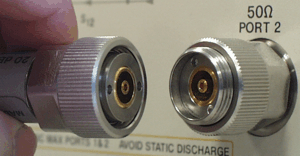
- The common threaded ring is screwed into the right connector
- Type: RF coaxial connector

Production history
- Manufacturer: Originally Amphenol, then Hewlett-Packard, then others

General specifications
- Diameter: 7 mm (0.28 in)
- Passband: 0–18 GHz

The APC-7 connector (also referred to as a 7 mm connector) is a precision coaxial connector used on laboratory microwave test equipment for frequencies up to 18 GHz. APC-7 connectors are advantageous because they have a low reflection coefficient, make repeatable coaxial connections, and are genderless. The connectors are expensive, so they are seldom used outside the laboratory where their cost can be justified by their accuracy and convenience. Due to their high cost, their 18 GHz frequency limitation, and new laboratory practices, (Note: Connections at the instrument front panel don't need to be repeatable because those connections remain mated during tests. Modern network analyzers focus on the reference plane near the device under test and have features such as automated calibration, adapter removal, and models for calibration references. The advantages of the APC-7 connector have been diminished.) the connectors are now uncommon. Modern low-frequency microwave equipment often uses the less expensive 3.5 mm (26.5 GHz) connector. Higher-frequency equipment must use higher-performance connectors such as the 2.92 mm (40 GHz), 2.4 mm (50 GHz), 1.85 mm (67 GHz), or 1.0 mm (110 GHz) connectors.

== Features ==
APC-7 connector pairs have several desirable features:

- The connectors are genderless. This avoids some awkward adapters or duplication of laboratory standards. With a gendered connector, a laboratory might need a precision male load and a precision female load. With a genderless connector, only one load is required. Although the illustration shows threads on one connector of the pair, all connectors contain a retractable male thread which can be revealed or retracted by turning the outer locking nut. Any two can be mated by retracting the thread in either one and leaving it protruding in the other.
- The connectors have a well-defined reference plane. Consequently, the connectors simplify some measurements.
- The mated pair of APC-7 connectors has a low reflection coefficient and thus low voltage standing wave ratio (VSWR). The low reflection coefficient means better measurement accuracy. The typical VSWR is 1.025:1 at 18 GHz.
- The mated pair makes a repeatable connection. A pair has a repeatable reflection coefficient to ±0.001. Consequently, laboratory measurements have reduced uncertainty.

== Adapters ==
APC-7 connectors require adapters to change from the connectors used in the laboratory to those used on everyday products. These adapters are expensive precision devices. For example, an APC-7 to type N (f) cost $105 in 1979. Such adapters bought new today (as of July 2012) can cost as much as $294.

== History ==
"APC" stands for Amphenol Precision Connector and "-7" for 7 millimetres. Hewlett-Packard started developing the connector in the mid-1960s. Amphenol improved the design and manufactured the connector.
