= IEC 81346 =

International standard

International Standard ISO/IEC 81346 series "Industrial systems, installations and equipment and industrial products – structuring principles and reference designations" defines the rules for reference designation systems (RDS). It is published as a double logo standard prepared by IEC technical committee 3: Information structures and elements, identification and marking principles, documentation and graphical symbols, in cooperation with ISO technical committee 10: Technical product documentation. The 81346 series replaces the deprecated IEC 61346:1996.

== Contents ==
- Part 1: Basic rules (IEC 81346-1:2022)
- Part 2: Classification of objects and codes for classes (IEC 81346-2:2019)
- Part 10: Power supply systems (ISO 81346-10:2022)
- Part 12: Construction works (ISO 81346-12:2018)
- Part 14: Manufacturing and Processing Systems (IEC 81346-14)
- Part 8: Properties
- Part 20: Vehicle Systems
- Part 50: Processes

== Double Logo Standards ==
Future developments of the standards on reference designations will be made in cooperation between the IEC and the ISO and published as IEC 81346. (Standards developed in cooperation between IEC and ISO are assigned numbers in the 80000 series)

== Outline ==
The standard consists of two parts and two supplements:

- EN 81346-1: General rules (IEC 81346-1:2022)
- EN 81346-2: Classification of objects and coding of classes (IEC 81346-2:2019)

The supplementary sheets for application guidelines (IEC/TR 61346-3:2001) and considerations of terms and their relationships (IEC 61346-4:1998) for DIN EN 61346 were withdrawn in May 2010 without replacement.

They are translations of the International Standard IEC 81346 published by the IEC. In 1997 the IEC changed the numbering of the IEC publications and added 60000 to the standard numbers used up to 1997. For example, IEC 61346 from 1996 was published under the number IEC 1346 but was listed under IEC 61346.

From 2010, the standards for reference marking will be published as a joint IEC/ ISO standard in the 80000 number range and then published under the number 81346.

== Preceding Standard ==
Preceding standard IEC 61346:1996 has been withdrawn and is replaced by ISO/IEC 81346.

== RDS-CW ==
ISO 81346-12, also known as RDS-CW (Reference Designation System for Construction Works), is the industry-specific application of the ISO/IEC 81346 standard series developed for the construction sector. It provides structuring principles and reference designation methodologies tailored to construction projects, facilitating classification and identification within the building and infrastructure environments, as well as utility and HVAC.

RDS-CW is designed to integrate with broader classification and structuring systems (such as BIM) enabling consistent designation of construction elements and the potential for alignment with other ISO/IEC 81346 applications like power system designations.

== RDS-PS ==
ISO 81346-10, commonly referred to as RDS-PS (Reference Designation System for Power Supply Systems) is the part of the ISO/IEC 81346 standard series that defines reference designations, principles, and structuring rules specifically for power and energy systems. Unlike RDS-PP (Reference Designation System for Power Plants), the current ISO/IEC 81346-10:2022 edition is published as a full international standard, reflecting broader applicability and alignment with the core structuring principles of the 81346 series.

RDS-PS supports clear and consistent designation of systems and system elements within every power and energy domain and industry, serving industries such as electrical power generation, transmission, and distribution, as well as other sectors where power supply structures are fundamental.

In support of ISO/IEC 81346-10:2022, the supplementary document ISO/TS 81346-101:2025, “Modelling concepts, guidelines and requirements for power supply systems”, has been published as a Technical Specification (TS). It provides additional modelling principles and practical guidance for the application of 81346-10 within power supply systems.

== RDS-MS ==
IEC 81346-14, referred to as RDS-MS (Reference Designation System for Manufacturing and Processing Systems), is a part of the ISO/IEC 81346 series currently under development for systems within the manufacturing and processing sector.

It provides industry-specific classification libraries intended for application across manufacturing and process industries, including consumer goods, machine building, industrial equipment, food and beverage, pharmaceuticals, packaging, and mining.

Currently, it is in the Final Draft International Standard (FDIS) stage of development, and once published, RDS-MS will offer a harmonized approach to structuring and identifying systems and components across manufacturing industries and process-oriented environments.

== Under Development ==
- Part 8: 81346-8: Properties

ISO/IEC 81346-8 defines principles and rules for the designation and identification of properties associated with objects and systems. The standard supports the consistent specification of characteristics in technical documentation and is intended to strengthen the relationship between objects and their properties, particularly during the design and engineering phases.

- Part 20: 81346-20: Vehicle Systems

ISO/IEC 81346-20, also known as RDS-VE (Reference Designation System for Vehicles), defines the principles and rules for structuring systems within vehicles and assigning reference designations. The standard addresses vehicles in a broad sense and is intended to support the design, planning, production, operation, and maintenance of aircraft, vessels, motor vehicles, rail vehicles, and other means of transportation.

- Part 50: 81346-50: Processes

ISO/IEC 81346-50 establishes principles and rules for the structuring and designation of processes and activities, rather than physical systems. It introduces a standardized framework for modelling and assigning reference designations to actions and operational activities, supporting consistent identification across IT systems, documentation, and technical information management.

== Forums ==
RDS4X website is a non-profit group set up to support collaboration among stakeholders working with the implementation of ISO/IEC 81346.

== Classifications ==
=== Components ===
The specification defines 616 components. They are categorized by main class (A), subclass (B), and leaf class (C).

IEC 81346-2:2019 components
A	B	C	Title
B			Sensing object
B	BA		Electric potential sensing object
B	BA	BAA	Voltage transformer
B	BA	BAB	Voltage relay
B	BB		Resistivity Sensing Object
B	BB	BBA	Electric resistivity sensor
B	BB	BBB	Electric resistivity detector
B	BB	BBC	Thermal resistivity sensor
B	BB	BBD	Thermal resistivity detector
B	BC		Electric current sensing object
B	BC	BCA	Current transformer
B	BC	BCB	Current relay
B	BD		Density sensing object
B	BD	BDA	Density transmitter
B	BD	BDB	Density switch
B	BE		Field sensing object
B	BE	BEA	Electric field detector
B	BE	BEB	Electric field sensor
B	BE	BEC	Magnetic field detector
B	BE	BED	Magnetic field sensor
B	BF		Flow sensing object
B	BF	BFA	Flow detector
B	BF	BFB	Flow sensor
B	BG		Physical dimension sensing object
B	BG	BGA	Position transmitter
B	BG	BGB	Position switch
B	BG	BGC	Distance transmitter
B	BG	BGD	Distance switch
B	BG	BGE	Angle transmitter
B	BG	BGF	Angle xwitch
B	BG	BGG	Object Scanner
B	BH		Energy sensing object
B	BH	BHA	Flow energy meter
B	BH	BHB	Thermal energy meter
B	BH	BHC	Electric energy meter
B	BJ		Power sensing object
B	BJ	BJA	Power meter
B	BJ	BJB	Power Limit Switch
B	BK		Time sensing object
B	BK	BKA	Time switch
B	BK	BKB	Timer sensor
B	BL		Level sensing object
B	BL	BLA	Level transmitter
B	BL	BLB	Level switch
B	BM		Humidity sensing object
B	BM	BMA	Humidity transmitter
B	BM	BMB	Humidity switch
B	BP		Pressure sensing object
B	BP	BPA	Absolute pressure transmitter
B	BP	BPB	Absolute Pressure Switch
B	BP	BPC	Differential pressure transmitter
B	BP	BPD	Differential pressure switch
B	BQ		Concentration sensing object
B	BQ	BQA	Gas sensor
B	BQ	BQB	Gas detector
B	BQ	BQC	Liquid sensor
B	BQ	BQD	Liquid detector
B	BQ	BQE	Solid matter sensor
B	BQ	BQF	Solid matter detector
B	BR		Radiation sensing object
B	BR	BRA	Light sensor
B	BR	BRB	Light detector
B	BR	BRC	Electromagnetic wave sensor
B	BR	BRD	Electromagnetic wave detector
B	BR	BRE	Radiation counter
B	BR	BRF	Radiation detector
B	BS		Time-rating object
B	BS	BSA	Cycle rate transmitter
B	BS	BSB	Cycle rate detecting switch
B	BS	BSC	Speed sensing transmitter
B	BS	BSD	Speed detecting switch
B	BS	BSE	Tachometer
B	BS	BSF	Rotation speed relay
B	BS	BSG	Accelerometer transmitter
B	BS	BSH	Accelerometer relay
B	BT		Temperature sensing object
B	BT	BTA	Temperature transmitter
B	BT	BTB	Temperature switch
B	BU		Multi-quantity sensing object
B	BU	BUA	Multi-sensor
B	BU	BUB	Multi-detector
B	BW		Force sensing object
B	BW	BWA	Weight transmitter
B	BW	BWB	Weight detecting switch
B	BW	BWC	Force value transmitter
B	BW	BWD	Force detecting switch
B	BW	BWE	Torque value transmitter
B	BW	BWF	Torque switch
B	BX		Audio-visual sensing object
B	BX	BXA	Acoustic sensor
B	BX	BXB	Acoustic detector
B	BX	BXC	Image sensor
B	BX	BXD	Image detector
B	BY		Information sensing object
B	BY	BYA	Chip reader
B	BY	BYB	Electromagnetic reader
B	BY	BYC	Optical reader
B	BZ		Incident sensing object
B	BZ	BZA	Counter
B	BZ	BZB	Threshold detector
B	BZ	BZC	Person detector
B	BZ	BZD	Matter detector
C			Storing object
C	CA		Capacitive storing object
C	CA	CAA	Capacitor
C	CB		Inductive storing object
C	CB	CBA	Inductor
C	CC		Electrochemical storing object
C	CC	CC]	echargeable battery
C	CF		Information storing object
C	CF	CFA	Information storing media
C	CL		Open stationary storing object
C	CL	CLA	Pool
C	CL	CLB	Shelf
C	CL	CLC	Seat
C	CM		Enclosed stationary storing object
C	CM	CMA	Tank
C	CM	CMB	Box
C	CN		Moveable storing object
C	CN	CNA	Container
C	CN	CNB	Gas cylinder
C	CN	CNC	Drum
C	CP		Thermal energy storing object
C	CP	CPA	Liquid Tank
C	CP	CPB	Gas tank
C	CP	CPC	Matter tank
C	CP	CPD	Crystalline tank
C	CQ		Mechanical energy storing object
C	CQ	CQA	Flywheel
C	CQ	CQB	Spring
C	CQ	CQC	Counterweight
E			Emitting object
E	EA		Light object
E	EA	EAA	Electric lamp
E	EA	EAB	Gas lamp
E	EA	EAC	Liqiud lamp
E	EB		Electric heating object
E	EB	EBA	Electric boiler
E	EB	EBB	Electric heating surface
E	EB	EBC	Heating cable
E	EB	EBD	Electric hot air blower
E	EB	EBE	Arc heating object
E	EB	EBF	Induction heater
E	EB	EBG	Infrared heater
E	EB	EBH	Electric oven
E	EC		Electric cooling object
E	EC	ECA	Electric cooling surface
E	EC	ECB	Electric cold air blower
E	EC	ECC	Compression chiller
E	EE		Wireless power object
E	EE	EEA	Inductive power antenna
E	EE	EEB	Magnetron
E	EE	EEC	X-ray source
E	EE	EED	Gamma ray source
E	EE	EEE	Capacitive coupler
E	EG		Thermal energy transfer object
E	EG	EGA	Heat pump
E	EG	EGB	Peltier element
E	EG	EGC	Heat exchanger
E	EM		Combustion heating object
E	EM	EMA	Stove
E	EM	EMB	Combustion boiler
E	EM	EMC	Burner
E	EP		Thermal heating object
E	EP	EPA	Heating surface
E	EP	EPB	Heating tube
E	EP	EPC	Heating panel
E	EP	EPD	Hot air blower
E	EQ		Thermal cooling object
E	EQ	EQA	Cooling surface
E	EQ	EQB	Cooling panel
E	EQ	EQC	Chiller
E	EQ	EQD	Cooler
E	EQ	EQE	Cooling tube
E	ET		Nuclear powered heating object
E	ET	ETA	Boiling water reactor
E	ET	ETB	Pressurized water reactor
E	ET	ETC	High-temperature gas-cooled reactor
E	EU		Particle emitting object
E	EU	EUA	Plasma generator
E	EU	EUB	Particle generator
E	EV		Acoustic wave emitting object
E	EV	EVA	Sonar
E	EV	EVB	Anti-noise loudspeaker
F			Protecting object
F	FA		Overvoltage protecting object
F	FA	FAA	Spark gap surge arrester
F	FA	FAB	Varistor surge arrester
F	FA	FAC	Zener diode
F	FA	FAD	Surge protector
F	FB		Earth fault current protecting object
F	FB	FBA	Residual current device
F	FB	FBB	Neutral earthing limiter
F	FC		Overcurrent protecting object
F	FC	FCA	Fuse
F	FC	FCB	Miniature circuit-breaker
F	FC	FCC	Bimetal
F	FE		Field protecting object
F	FE	FEA	Electric field shield
F	FE	FEB	Magnetic field shield
F	FE	FEC	Electromagnetic field shield
F	FL		Pressure protecting object
F	FL	FLA	Safety valve
F	FL	FLB	Safety damper
F	FL	FLC	Vacuum breaker
F	FL	FLD	Rupture disc
F	FL	FLE	Expansion tank
F	FM		Fire protecting object
F	FM	FMA	Fire damper
F	FM	FMB	Flue damper
F	FM	FMC	Fire-and-flue damper
F	FM	FMD	Fire extinguisher
F	FM	FME	Fire blind
F	FM	FMF	Smoke curtain
F	FM	FMG	Smoke closure
F	FM	FMH	Fire insulation
F	FM	FMJ	Fire retardant coating
F	FM	FMK	Fire impregnation
F	FN		Mechanical force protecting object
F	FN	FNA	Safety clutch
F	FN	FNB	Impact protection
F	FQ		Preventive protecting object
F	FQ	FQA	Protective mesh
F	FQ	FQB	Glide protection
F	FQ	FQC	Protective rod
F	FQ	FQD	Protective rail
F	FQ	FQE	Protective fabric
F	FQ	FQF	Glare protection
F	FQ	FQG	Splatter protection
F	FQ	FQH	Break protection
F	FQ	FQJ	Lock hatch cover
F	FR		Wear protection object
F	FR	FRA	Lubrication object
F	FR	FRB	Wear pad
F	FS		Environment protecting object
F	FS	FSA	Plaster
F	FS	FSB	Paint
F	FS	FSC	Impregnation
F	FS	FSD	Shelter
F	FS	FSE	Seismic vibration control device
F	FS	FSF	Corrosion protection
F	FS	FSG	Protective seal
F	FS	FSH	Material separating layer
G			Generating object
G	GA		Mechanical to electrical energy generating object
G	GA	GAA	AC generator
G	GA	GAB	DC generator
G	GB		Chemical to electrical energy generating object
G	GB	GBA	Electric battery
G	GB	GBB	Fuel cell
G	GC		Solar to electrical energy generating object
G	GC	GCA	Crystalline photovoltaic module
G	GC	GCB	Thin film photovoltaic module
G	GF		Signal generating object
G	GF	GFA	Electromagnetical transmitter
G	GF	GFB	Signal generator
G	GL		Continuous transfer object
G	GL	GLA	Belt conveyer
G	GL	GLB	Chain conveyer
G	GL	GLC	Roller conveyer
G	GL	GLD	Screw conveyer
G	GL	GLE	Escalator
G	GL	GLF	Paternoster
G	GL	GLG	Vibrating conveyor
G	GM		Discontinuous transfer object
G	GM	GMA	Wagon
G	GM	GMB	Elevator
G	GM	GMC	Crane
G	GM	GMD	Palletizer
G	GM	GME	Turntable
G	GM	GMF	Vibrating feeder
G	GP		Liquid flow generating object
G	GP	GPA	Positive displacement pump
G	GP	GPB	Liquid velocity pump
G	GP	GPC	Hydraulic ram pump
G	GP	GPD	Lubricator
G	GQ		Gaseous flow generating object
G	GQ	GQA	Gas compressor
G	GQ	GQB	Mechanical fan
G	GQ	GQC	Gas ejector
G	GR		Solar to thermal energy generating object
G	GR	GRA	Solar Panel
G	GR	GRB	Solar tower
H			Matter processing object
H	HJ		Primary forming object
H	HJ	HJA	Casting tool
H	HJ	HJB	Press
H	HK		Surface treatment object
H	HK	HKA	Surface preparation machine
H	HK	HKB	Surface modification machine
H	HK	HKC	Surface coating machine
H	HL		Assembling object
H	HL	HLA	Assembly robot
H	HL	HLB	Mechanical joining machine
H	HL	HLC	Thermal welding machine
H	HL	HLD	Chemical joining machine
H	HM		Force separating object
H	HM	HMA	Settling tank
H	HM	HMB	Centrifuge
H	HM	HMC	Cyclone
H	HP		Thermal separating object
H	HP	HPA	Dryer
H	HP	HPB	Distillation column
H	HQ		Mechanical separating object
H	HQ	HQA	Skimmer
H	HQ	HQB	Separation grate
H	HR		Electric or magnetic separating object
H	HR	HRA	Electrostatic separator
H	HR	HRB	Magnetic separator
H	HS		Chemical separating object
H	HS	HSA	Ion exchanger
H	HS	HSB	Absorber
H	HS	HSC	Adsorber
H	HU		Grinding and crushing object
H	HU	HUA	Cutter
H	HU	HUB	Mill
H	HU	HUC	Crusher
H	HV		Agglomerating object
H	HV	HVA	Pelletizer
H	HV	HVB	Flocculator
H	HW		Mixing object
H	HW	HWA	Mixer
H	HW	HWB	Humidifier
H	HX		Reacting object
H	HX	HXA	Chemical reactor
H	HX	HXB	Fermenter
K			Information processing object
K	KE		Electric signal processing object
K	KE	KEA	Computer
K	KE	KEB	Control unit
K	KE	KEC	Communication device
K	KE	KED	Router
K	KE	KEE	Card writer
K	KF		Electric signal relaying object
K	KF	KFA	Relay
K	KF	KFB	Time relay
K	KF	KFC	Repeater
K	KF	KFD	Electric network bridge
K	KF	KFE	Electric network switch
K	KG		Optical signalling object
K	KG	KGA	Optical network switch
K	KG	KGB	Optical router
K	KG	KGC	Optical repeater
K	KH		Fluid signalling object
K	KH	KHA	Fluid controller
K	KH	KHB	Pilot valve
K	KJ		Mechanical signalling object
K	KJ	KJA	Mechanical regulator
K	KJ	KJB	Locking cylinder
K	KJ	KJC	Key coded device
K	KZ		Multiple kind signalling object
K	KZ	KZA	Multiple kind switch
M			Driving object
M	MA		Electromagnetic rotational driving object
M	MA	MAA	Electric motor
M	MA	MAB	Stepper motor
M	MB		Electromagnetic linear driving object
M	MB	MBA	Linear motor
M	MB	MBB	Electromagnet
M	MC		Magnetic force driving object
M	MC	MCA	Permanent magnet
M	MD		Piezoelectric driving object
M	MD	MDA	Piezoelectric motor
M	ML		Mechanical energy driving object
M	ML	MLA	Gravity energy drive
M	ML	MLB	Elastic energy drive
M	ML	MLC	Wind turbine
M	ML	MLD	Water turbine
M	ML	MLE	Gas turbine
M	MM		Fluid powered driving object
M	MM	MMA	Hydraulic cylinder
M	MM	MMB	Pneumatic cylinder
M	MM	MMC	Hydraulic motor
M	MM	MMD	Pneumatic motor
M	MS		Combustion engine
M	MS	MSA	Otto cycle engine
M	MS	MSB	Diesel cycle engine
M	MS	MSC	Wankel engine
M	MT		Heat engine
M	MT	MTA	Steam engine
M	MT	MTB	Stirling Engine
N			Covering object
N	NA		Infilling object
N	NA	NAA	Pane
N	NA	NAB	Panel
N	NA	NAC	Grating
N	NA	NAD	Sealing joint
N	NB		Closure object
N	NB	NBA	Door leaf
N	NB	NBB	Leaf of large door
N	NB	NBC	Cabinet door
N	NB	NBD	Gate leaf
N	NB	NBE	Hatch cover
N	NC		Finishing object
N	NC	NCA	Paving
N	NC	NCB	Wall covering
N	NC	NCC	Flooring
N	NC	NCD	Ceiling finish
N	NC	NCE	Roofing
N	NC	NCF	Window Sill
N	NC	NCG	Plant mat
N	NC	NCH	Surface forming object
N	ND		Terminating object
N	ND	NDA	Curb
N	ND	NDB	Crown
N	ND	NDC	Raised floor edge
N	ND	NDD	Ceiling edge
N	ND	NDE	Fascia
N	NE		Hiding object
N	NE	NEA	Ceiling lining
N	NE	NEB	Skirting board
N	NE	NEC	Wall corner lining
N	NE	NED	Flashing
N	NE	NEE	Reveal liner
P			Presenting object
P	PF		Visible state indicator
P	PF	PFA	Signal lamp
P	PF	PFB	Semaphore
P	PG		Scalar display
P	PG	PGA	Voltmeter
P	PG	PGB	Resistivity indicator
P	PG	PGC	Ampere meter
P	PG	PGD	Density indicator
P	PG	PGE	Field indicator
P	PG	PGF	Flow meter
P	PG	PGG	Dimension indicator
P	PG	PGH	Energy meter
P	PG	PGJ	Wattmeter
P	PG	PGK	Clock
P	PG	PGL	Level indicator
P	PG	PGM	Humidity indicator
P	PG	PGP	Pressure indicator
P	PG	PGQ	Concentration indicator
P	PG	PGR	Electromagnetic wave indicator
P	PG	PGS	Frequency meter
P	PG	PGT	Temperature indicator
P	PG	PGV	power factor meter
P	PG	PGW	Force indicator
P	PG	PGX	Audio spectrometer
P	PG	PGZ	Quantity meter
P	PH		Graphical display
P	PH	PHA	Display
P	PH	PHB	Projector
P	PH	PHC	Printer
P	PH	PHD	Marking
P	PH	PHE	Sign
P	PH	PHF	Marking post
P	PJ		Acoustic device
P	PJ	PJA	Loudspeaker
P	PJ	PJB	Horn
P	PJ	PJC	Bell
P	PK		Tactile device
P	PK	PKA	Vibrator
P	PK	PKB	Braille text sign
P	PK	PKC	Free height warning
P	PL		Ornamental object
P	PL	PLA	Cornice
P	PL	PLB	Figure
P	PL	PLC	Frieze
P	PL	PLD	Picture
P	PL	PLE	Carpet
P	PZ		Multiple form presenting object
P	PZ	PZA	Audio-visual alarm
P	PZ	PZB	Television set
Q			Controlling object
Q	QA		Electric controlling object
Q	QA	QAA	Contactor
Q	QA	QAB	Circuit breaker
Q	QA	QAC	Electronic power switch
Q	QB		Electric separating object
Q	QB	QBA	Fuseless disconnector
Q	QB	QBB	Fused disconnector
Q	QC		Electric earthing object
Q	QC	QCA	Earthing switch
Q	QM		Sealed fluid switching object
Q	QM	QMA	Liquid shutoff valve
Q	QM	QMB	Gas shutoff valve
Q	QN		Sealed fluid varying object
Q	QN	QNA	Liquid control valve
Q	QN	QNB	Gas control valve
Q	QP		Open fluid controlling object
Q	QP	QPA	Lock gate
Q	QP	QPB	Vortex generator
Q	QP	QPC	Rudder
Q	QQ		Space access object
Q	QQ	QQA	Window
Q	QQ	QQB	Window unit
Q	QQ	QQC	Door
Q	QQ	QQD	Hatch
Q	QQ	QQE	Large door
Q	QQ	QQF	Gate
Q	QQ	QQG	Rail scotch block
Q	QR		Solid substance flow varying object
Q	QR	QRA	Rotary air lock valve
Q	QR	QRB	Iris valve
Q	QR	QRC	Flap gate valve
Q	QS		Mechanical movement controlling object
Q	QS	QSA	Lock
Q	QS	QSB	Track switch
Q	QZ		Multiple measure controlling object
Q	QZ	QZA	Earthing and disconnecting switch
R			Restricting object
R	RA		Electricity restricting object
R	RA	RAA	Diode
R	RA	RAB	Reactor
R	RA	RAC	Resistor
R	RB		Electricity stabilising object
R	RB	RBA	Uninterrupted power supply
R	RB	RBB	Power filter
R	RB	RBC	Phase compensator
R	RB	RBD	Power equaliser
R	RF		Signal stabilising object
R	RF	RFA	Signal equaliser
R	RF	RFB	Signal filter
R	RL		Movement restricting object
R	RL	RLA	Security chain
R	RL	RLB	Shock absorber
R	RL	RLC	Brake
R	RL	RLD	Speed bump
R	RM		Return flow restricting object
R	RM	RMA	Non-return valve
R	RM	RMB	Check damper
R	RM	RMC	Flap
R	RM	RMD	Stench trap
R	RN		Flow restrictor
R	RN	RNA	Regulating valve
R	RN	RNB	Regulating damper
R	RN	RNC	Soilds regulating valve
R	RN	RND	Diffuser
R	RQ		Local climate stabilising object
R	RQ	RQA	Insulation
R	RQ	RQB	Stabilizing layer
R	RQ	RQC	Noise barrier
R	RQ	RQD	Screen
R	RQ	RQE	Curtain
R	RQ	RQF	Louvered blind
R	RQ	RQG	Shutter
R	RQ	RQH	Weed control fabric
R	RQ	RQJ	Screen wall
R	RU		Access restricting object
R	RU	RUA	Fence
R	RU	RUB	Movable barrier
R	RU	RUC	Turnstile
R	RU	RUD	Bollard
R	RU	RUE	Rodent barrier
R	RU	RUF	Bird mesh
S			Human interacting object
S	SF		Face interaction object
S	SF	SFA	Eye focus reader
S	SF	SFB	Face recognition device
S	SG		Hand interaction device
S	SG	SGA	Turn handle
S	SG	SGB	Grip handle
S	SG	SGC	Push handle
S	SG	SGD	Lever handle
S	SG	SGE	Pull handle
S	SG	SGF	Key
S	SH		Foot interaction device
S	SH	SHA	Pedal switch
S	SJ		Finger interaction device
S	SJ	SJA	Flip switch
S	SJ	SJB	Pushbutton
S	SJ	SJC	Touch actuator
S	SJ	SJD	Turning wheel
S	SK		Movement interaction device
S	SK	SKA	Joystick
S	SK	SKB	Mouse
S	SZ		Multi-interaction device
S	SZ	SZA	Operating panel
T			Transforming object
T	TA		Electric energy transforming object
T	TA	TAA	Transformer
T	TA	TAB	DC/DC converter
T	TA	TAC	Frequency converter
T	TA	TAD	Phase shifter
T	TB		Electric energy converting object
T	TB	TBA	Rectifier
T	TB	TBB	Inverter
T	TB	TBC	Bidirectional converter
T	TC		Universal power supply
T	TC	TCA	Universal AC power supply
T	TC	TCB	Universal DC power supply
T	TF		Signal converting object
T	TF	TFA	Amplifier
T	TF	TFB	Signal antenna
T	TF	TFC	Signal converter
T	TF	TFD	Optical receiver/transmitter
T	TF	TFE	Telephone
T	TL		Mechanical energy transforming object
T	TL	TLA	Gear
T	TL	TLB	Torque converter
T	TL	TLC	Lever
T	TM		Mass reduction object
T	TM	TMA	Drilling machine
T	TM	TMB	Thermal cutter
T	TM	TMC	Etching machine
T	TP		Matter reshaping object
T	TP	TPA	Forging machine
T	TP	TPB	Extruder
T	TP	TPC	Wire drawing machine
T	TP	TPD	Rolling machine
T	TP	TPE	Bending machine
T	TP	TPF	Electromagnetic forming machine
T	TR		Organic plant
T	TR	TRA	Tree
T	TR	TRB	Shrub
T	TR	TRC	Climber
T	TR	TRD	Herb
U			Holding object
U	UA		Positioning object
U	UA	UAA	Isolator
U	UA	UAB	Cable gland
U	UA	UAC	Light fixture
U	UA	UAD	Stair stringer
U	UA	UAE	Batten
U	UA	UAF	Stake
U	UA	UAG	Rail gauge
U	UA	UAH	Clamp
U	UA	UAJ	Vehicle stand
U	UB		Carrying object
U	UB	UBA	Cable tray
U	UB	UBB	Hanger
U	UB	UBC	Tread
U	UB	UBD	Mast
U	UB	UBE	Table
U	UB	UBF	Portal
U	UC		Enclosing object
U	UC	UCA	Cubicle
U	UC	UCB	Plant soil
U	UC	UCC	Cooker hood
U	UL		Structural supporting object
U	UL	ULA	Base course
U	UL	ULB	Console
U	UL	ULC	Pile
U	UL	ULD	Column
U	UL	ULE	Beam
U	UL	ULF	Tension brace
U	UL	ULG	Block
U	UL	ULH	Arch
U	UL	ULJ	Abutment
U	UL	ULK	Slab plate
U	UL	ULL	Retaining wall plate
U	UL	ULM	Wall plate
U	UL	ULN	Shell
U	UL	ULP	Continuous arch
U	UL	ULQ	Bearing plate
U	UL	ULR	Catenary
U	UM		Reinforcing object
U	UM	UMA	Reinforcing rod
U	UM	UMB	Reinforcing mesh
U	UM	UMC	Reinforcing mass layer
U	UM	UMD	Reinforcing matter
U	UM	UME	Security strike plate
U	UM	UMF	Splice
U	UM	UMG	Soil vertical drain
U	UM	UMH	Concrete spurting
U	UM	UMJ	Concrete lining
U	UM	UMK	Stiffener
U	UM	UML	Diagonal bonding
U	UM	UMM	Stabilizing cable
U	UM	UMN	Horizontal rail
U	UM	UMP	Earth pressure embankment
U	UN		Framing object
U	UN	UNA	Fixed frame
U	UN	UNB	Threshold
U	UN	UNC	Movable frame
U	UN	UND	Glazing bar frame
U	UP		Jointing object
U	UP	UPA	Bearing
U	UP	UPB	Hinge
U	UP	UPC	Chemical joint
U	UQ		Fastening object
U	UQ	UQA	Fixed fastening
U	UQ	UQB	Removable fastening
U	UQ	UQC	Chemical bond
U	UT		Levelling object
U	UT	UTA	Filling
U	UT	UTB	Excavation
U	UU		Existing ground
U	UU	UUA	Rock
U	UU	UUB	Friction soil
U	UU	UUC	Cohesive soil
U	UU	UUD	Organic soil
U	UU	UUE	Filled material
W			Guiding object
W	WB		High voltage electric energy guiding object
W	WB	WBA	High voltage busbar
W	WB	WBB	High voltage cable
W	WB	WBC	High voltage wire
W	WB	WBD	High voltage bushing
W	WD		Low voltage electric energy guiding object
W	WD	WDA	Low voltage busbar
W	WD	WDB	Low voltage cable
W	WD	WDC	Low voltage wire
W	WD	WDD	Low voltage bushing
W	WE		Reference potential guiding object
W	WE	WEA	Earthing rail
W	WE	WEB	Earthing cable
W	WE	WEC	Equipotential bonding rail
W	WE	WED	Equipotential bonding cable
W	WG		Electric signal guiding object
W	WG	WGA	Control cable
W	WG	WGB	Data cable
W	WG	WGC	Electric signal bushing
W	WH		Light guiding object
W	WH	WHA	Fibre optical cable
W	WH	WHB	Optical light fibre
W	WH	WHC	Lens
W	WH	WHD	Mirror
W	WJ		Sound guiding object
W	WJ	WJA	Sound reflector
W	WL		Solid matter guiding object
W	WL	WLA	Roller table
W	WL	WLB	Chute
W	WM		Open enclosure guiding object
W	WM	WMA	Drainage layer
W	WM	WMB	Gutter
W	WM	WMC	Drain liquid flashing
W	WM	WMD	Drip nose
W	WM	WME	Gutter drip
W	WM	WMF	Drainpipe
W	WM	WMG	Infiltration chamber
W	WP		Closed enclosure guiding object
W	WP	WPA	Pipe
W	WP	WPB	Duct
W	WP	WPC	Hose
W	WQ		Mechanical energy guiding object
W	WQ	WQA	Drive axle
W	WQ	WQB	Drive belt
W	WQ	WQC	Drive chain
W	WQ	WQD	Drive link
W	WQ	WQE	Wheel
W	WQ	WQF	Toothed bar
W	WQ	WQG	Hydraulic hose
W	WR		Rail object
W	WR	WRA	Track
W	WR	WRB	Track crossing
W	WV		Thermal energy guiding object
W	WV	WVA	Thermal conductor
W	WV	WVB	Thermal paste
W	WZ		Multiple flow guiding object
W	WZ	WZA	Umbilical cable
X			Interfacing object
X	XB		High voltage connecting object
X	XB	XBA	High voltage terminal
X	XB	XBB	High voltage socket
X	XB	XBC	High voltage terminal box
X	XD		Low voltage connecting object
X	XD	XDA	Electric terminal
X	XD	XDB	Low voltage power socket
X	XD	XDC	Terminal box
X	XD	XDD	Power outlet
X	XD	XDE	Power distributer
X	XE		Potential connecting object
X	XE	XEA	PE terminal
X	XE	XEB	PB terminal
X	XE	XEC	FE terminal
X	XE	XED	FB terminal
X	XE	XEE	Earth electrode
X	XE	XEF	Collector
X	XG		Electric signal connecting object
X	XG	XGA	Signal socket
X	XG	XGB	Terminal
X	XG	XGC	Patch panel
X	XG	XGD	Signal distributor
X	XH		Light connecting object
X	XH	XHA	Fixed light fibre socket
X	XK		Collecting interfacing object
X	XK	XKA	Sink
X	XK	XKB	Toilet
X	XK	XKC	Urinal
X	XK	XKD	Drip cup
X	XK	XKE	Floor drain
X	XM		Sealed flow connecting object
X	XM	XMA	Tube flange
X	XM	XMB	Tube fitting
X	XN		Non-detachable coupling
X	XN	XNA	Flange coupler
X	XN	XNB	Split-muff coupler
X	XN	XNC	Hirth coupler
X	XN	XND	Cardan joint
X	XN	XNE	Buffer-and-chain coupler
X	XN	XNF	Link-and pin coupler
X	XP		Detachable coupling
X	XP	XPA	Friction clutch
X	XP	XPB	Fluid coupling
X	XP	XPC	Overrunning clutch
X	XP	XPD	Magnetic hoist
X	XS		Level connecting component
X	XS	XSA	Landing
X	XS	XSB	Flight of stairs
X	XS	XSC	Ladder
X	XS	XSD	Ramp
X	XS	XSE	Fireman’s pole
X	XT		Space linking object
X	XT	XTA	Hole
X	XT	XTB	Box-out
X	XZ		Multiple flow connector object
X	XZ	XZA	Multi connector

== See also ==
- Reference designator
- Functional specification
- List of IEC standards
