= MCX connector =

Coaxial RF connectors developed in the 1980s

MCX
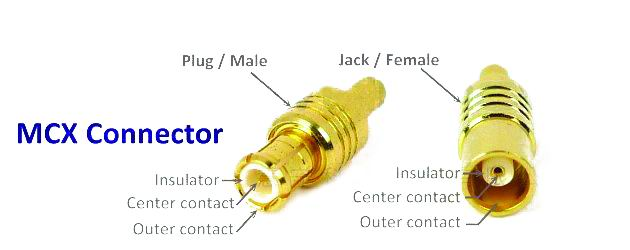
- MCX Connector (male & female)
- Type: RF coaxial connector

Production history
- Designed: 1980s

General specifications
- Diameter: 3.6 millimetres (0.14 in)
- Cable: Coaxial
- Passband: 0-6 GHz

MCX (micro coaxial) connectors are coaxial RF connectors developed in the 1980s. They have the same inner contact and insulator dimensions as the SMB connector but are 30% smaller. MCX is standardized in European CECC 22220. The connectors are rated for ≥500 mating cycles.

== Connector design ==
MCX connectors use a snap-on interface and usually have a 50 Ω impedance (some are 75 Ω) . They offer broadband capability from DC to 6 GHz. The contact surfaces are gold-plated.

The outer diameter of the plug is approximately 3.6 mm or 0.140 inch.

== Use ==
MCX and the smaller MMCX connector are frequently used to connect external antennas to GPS receivers. They are also common on USB DVB-T tuners for computers and laptops, to connect an external antenna to the tuner.

The MCX connector is also being used on at least some of the new generation of mostly inexpensive software-defined oscilloscopes and/or signal generators such as the DS212. This is a low frequency application, at most a few MHz bandwidth, so the electrical performance characteristics are relatively unimportant, however the small size would appear to be an important feature.

== See also ==
- MMCX connector (micro-miniature coaxial connector)
- TNC connector
- SMA connector
- SMB connector
- F connector
