= Neill–Concelman connector =

A Neill–Concelman connector may refer to:

- BNC connector, with bayonet-type fastening
- TNC connector, threaded version
