= SR connector =

Type of electrical connector

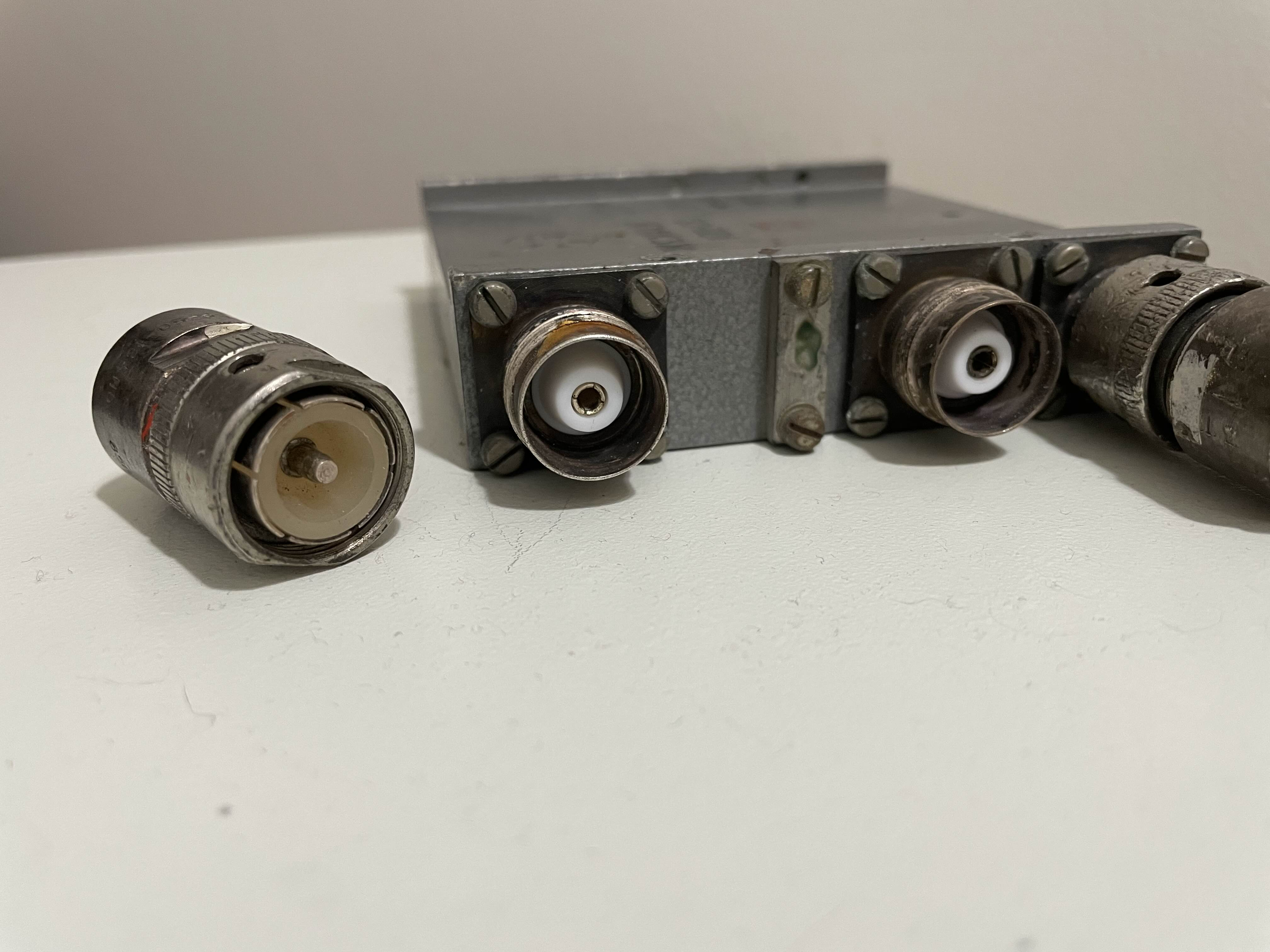
View of male and female versions of the Russian SR-50 coax connector

The SR connector or CP connector (Russian: Соединитель Радиочастотный, 'radio frequency connector') is a Russian-made radio frequency connector for coaxial cables. It is based on the American BNC connector. Types with an American equivalent have slightly different dimensions due to discrepancies in imperial to metric conversion, though with some force the two can still be mated. There are other types which do not resemble their American counterpart.

Most SR connectors are variants of SR-50 (50 Ω) or SR-75 (75 Ω) versions, with the SR-75 typically having a thinner center pin. They often resemble C connectors in shape, and have threaded inserts similar to N connectors. Further numerical suffixes denote specific kinds of connectors, for instance the CP 75-164 is a much larger high power connector, designed for upwards of 3000W, with a similar appearance to an N or UHF type. The various letters after the number refer to the dielectric material used.

Below is a breakdown of the various suffixes used in the order they would appear:

Symbol	Meaning	Details
Г (G)	Hermetically sealed	From Russian Герметичный
50 or 75	Design impedance of the connector in ohms	
###	Three numeral connector type designation	i.e. CP-75-164
Ф (F) or П (P)	Dielectric material (either фторопласт (PTFE/Teflon) or полиэтилен (Polyethylene))	
В (V)	Meets GOST standardization requirements	From Russian Bсеклиматическое исполнение по ГОСТ В 20.39.404-81

== See also ==
- BNC connector
- RF connector
