= SMB connector =

Coaxial RF connector

SMB
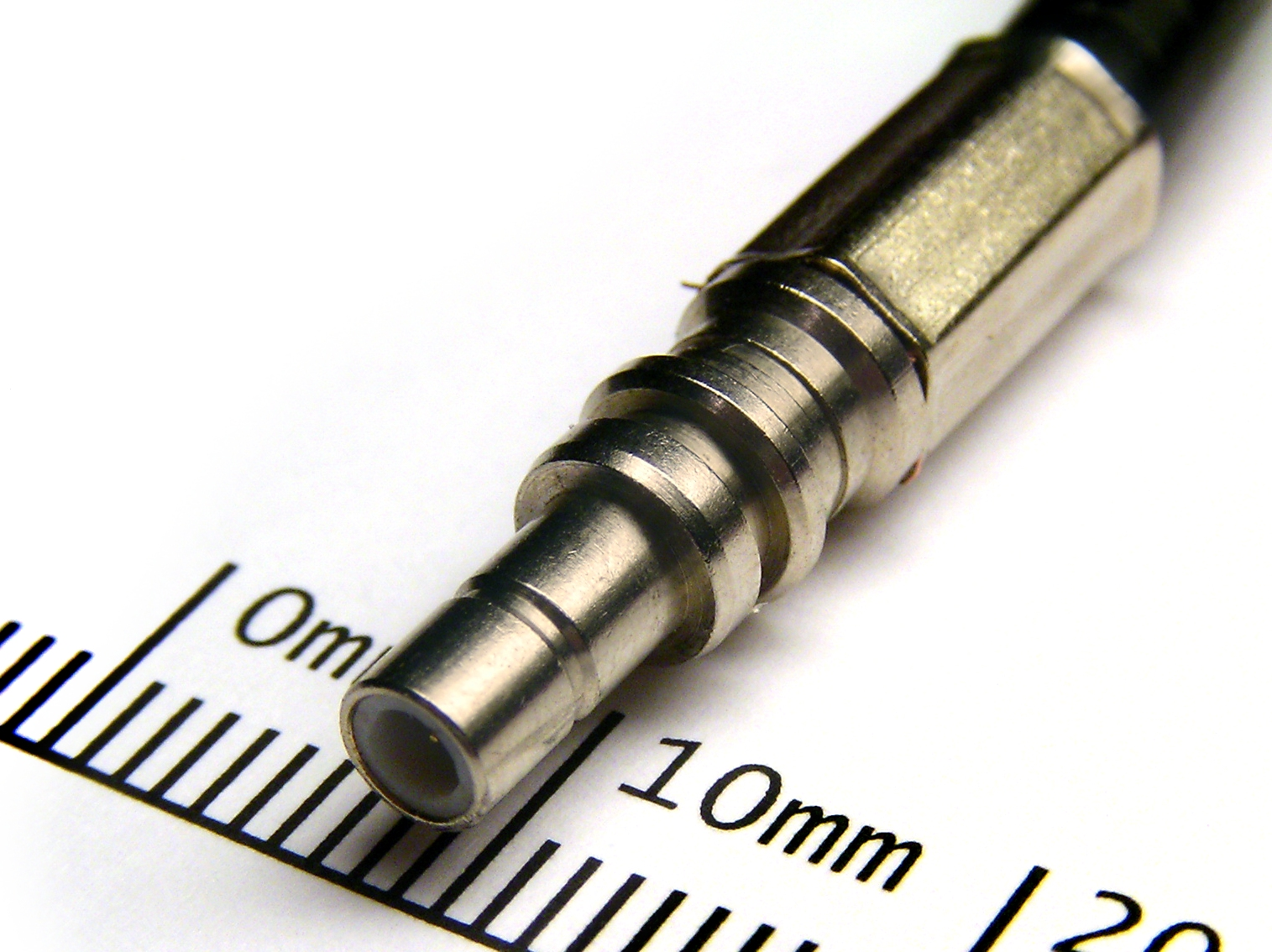
- Custom SMB jack connector crimped to a 5 mm coaxial cable
- Type: RF coaxial connector

Production history
- Designed: 1960s
- Manufacturer: Various
- Cable: Coaxial
- Passband: Typically 0–4 GHz

SMB (SubMiniature version B) connectors are coaxial RF connectors developed in the 1960s. SMB connectors are smaller than SMA connectors.

They feature a snap-on coupling and are available in either 50 Ω or 75 Ω impedance. They offer excellent electrical performance from DC to 4 GHz.

An SMB jack has a male center pin, while an SMB plug has a female basket.

Connectors are available for two SMB cable sizes:

1. Cable 2.6/50+75 S (3 mm outer / 1.7 mm inner diameter) and
2. Cable 2/50 S (2.2 mm outer / 1 mm inner diameter)

== SSMB-Nano ==
The SSMB-Nano connector is a small version of the standard SMB connector with a 'snap-on' coupling.

1. Impedance: 50 Ohm
2. Operating frequency: DC–12.4 GHz

== See also ==
- SMA connector, SMC connector
- BNC connector, TNC connector, N connector
- MCX connector, MMCX connector

== Sources ==
- MIL-C-39012
- MIL-STD-348
- MIL-STD-202
