= MMCX connector =

Coaxial RF connectors similar to MCX but smaller

MMCX
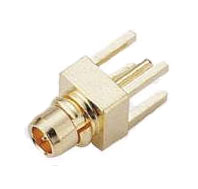
- MMCX Straight Male P.C.B. Plug
- Type: RF coaxial connector

Production history
- Designed: 1990s

General specifications
- Diameter: 2.4 millimetres (0.095 in)
- Cable: Coaxial
- Passband: 0-6 GHz

Micro-miniature coaxial (MMCX) connectors are coaxial RF connectors similar to MCX but smaller. They conform to the European CECC 22000 specification. MMCX connectors are rated to 500 mating cycles. The connectors have a lock-snap mechanism allowing 360-degree rotation and usually have a 50 Ω impedance. They offer broadband capability from DC to 6 GHz.

MMCX connectors are seen on Wi-Fi PCMCIA cards as antenna connectors or as connectors for external GPS antennas on small devices like PDAs or GPS receivers, or on mobile phones to connect external GSM-Antennas. They are also used by various brands of in-ear monitors to connect the cable to the individual earpieces. This allows for the cables to be replaced or swapped. They were developed in the 1990s.

MMCX is also used in some video transmitters for First-Person View (FPV) radio control piloting. This makes swapping antennas and repairing easier than the U.FL connectors.

== See also ==
- MCX connector - Micro coaxial
- TNC connector
- SMA connector
- U.FL connector
