= SHV connector =

Type of RF connector

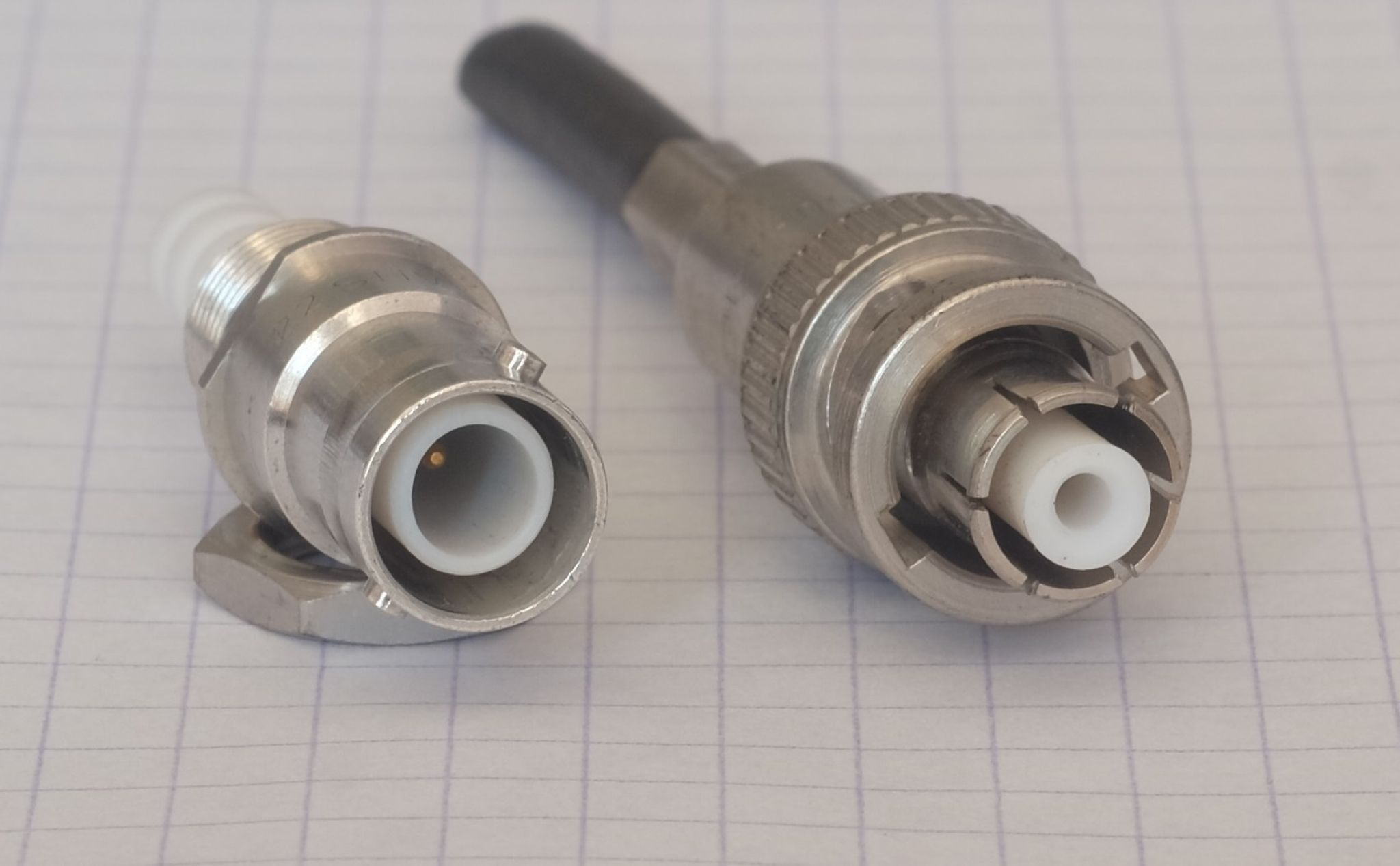
- Male and female SHV connectors
- Type: RF coaxial connector

Production history
- Manufacturer: Various
- Cable: Coaxial

Electrical
- Max. voltage: 5000 V DC
- Max. current: 5 A

The SHV (safe high voltage) connector is a type of RF connector used for terminating a coaxial cable. The connector uses a bayonet mount similar to those of the BNC and MHV connectors, but is easily distinguished due to its very thick and protruding insulator. This insulation geometry makes SHV connectors safer for handling high voltage than MHV connectors, by preventing accidental contact with the live conductor in an unmated connector or plug. The connector is also designed such that when it is being disconnected from a plug, the high-voltage contact is broken before the ground contact, to prevent accidental shocks. The connector is also designed to prevent users from forcing a high-voltage connector into a low-voltage plug or conversely (as can happen with MHV and BNC connectors), by reversing the gender compared to BNC.

Details of the connector comprising dimensions of the mating parts, voltage rating, minimum insulation requirements and more are specified by the IEC document 60498.

SHV connectors are used in laboratory settings for voltages and currents beyond the capacity of BNC and MHV connectors. Standard SHV connectors are rated for 5000 volts DC and 5 amperes, although higher-voltage versions (to 20 kV) are also available.
