= HeliWhale Afalina =

Afalina

General information
- Type: Multipurpose helicopter
- Manufacturer: HeliWhale
- Designer: Kolesnik Yakov
- Status: Beginning production in early 2016

History
- Introduction date: 2015

The HeliWhale Afalina is an ultra-light, coaxial two-seat multipurpose helicopter. The name Afalina comes from the Russian word for "bottlenose dolphin", named for the helicopter's resemblance to the marine mammal.

== Specification ==
General characteristics

- Crew: 1
- Capacity: 2
- Length: 7.2 m (23 ft 7 in)
- Height: 2.8 m (9 ft 2 in)
- Empty weight: 270 kg (595 lb)
- Max takeoff weight: 500 kg (1,102 lb)
- Powerplant: 1 × Rotax 914 four cylinder, liquid and air-cooled, turbocharged, four stroke aircraft engine, 86 kW (115 hp)
- Propellers: 6-bladed composite

Performance

- Maximum speed: 250 km/h (160 mph, 130 kn)
- Cruise speed: 200 km/h (120 mph, 110 kn)
- Range: 750 km (470 mi, 400 nmi)
- Service ceiling: 2,000 m (6,600 ft)
