= BNC connector =

Radio-frequency connector for coaxial cable

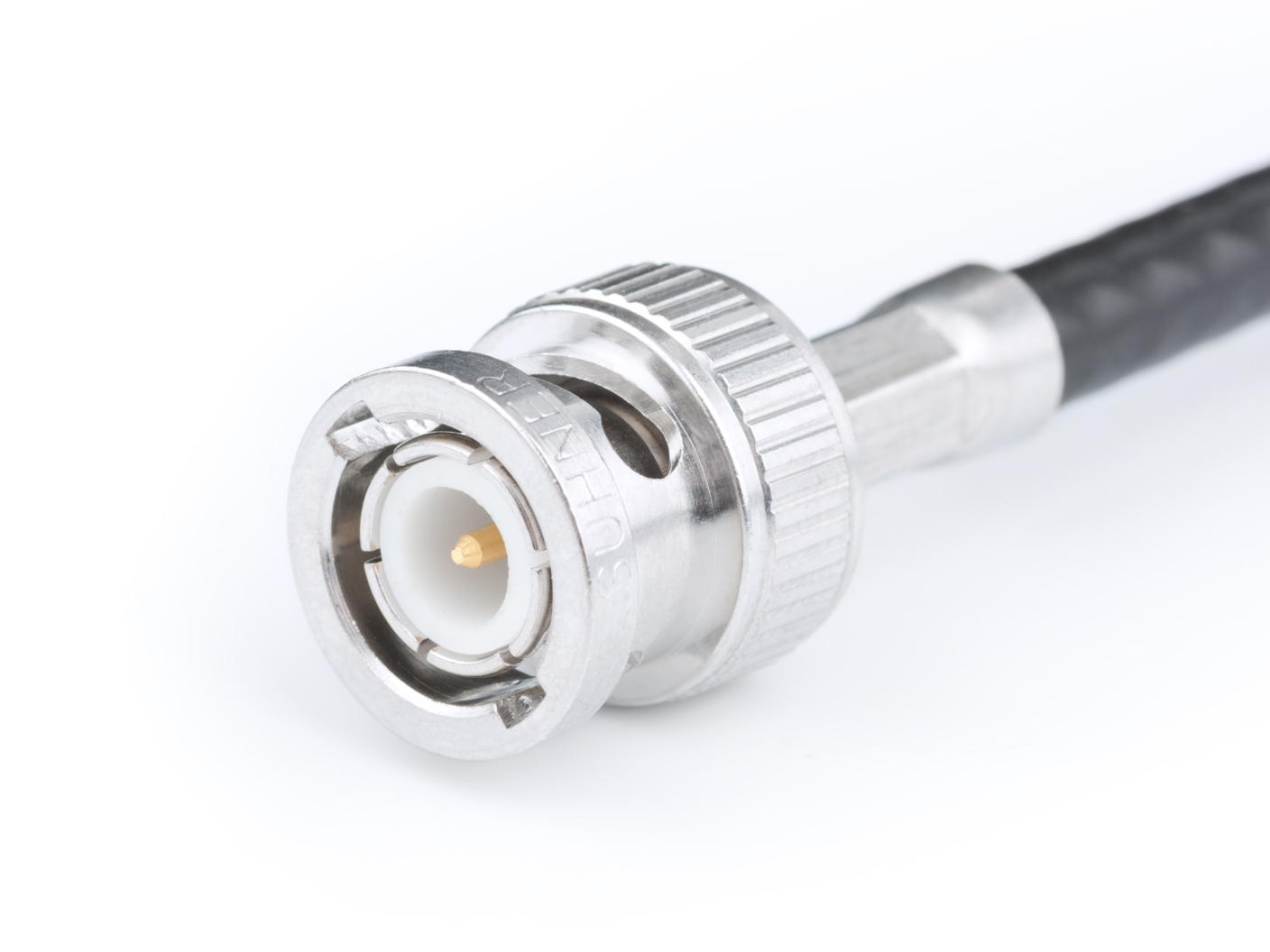
- Male 50 ohm BNC connector
- Type: RF coaxial connector

Production history
- Designer: Paul Neill
- Designed: 1944
- Manufacturer: Various

General specifications
- Diameter: Outer, typical: 0.570 in (14.5 mm), male; 0.436 in (11.1 mm), female
- Cable: Coaxial
- Passband: Typically 0–4 GHz

The BNC connector is a miniature quick-connect/disconnect radio-frequency connector for coaxial cable. It was introduced on military radio equipment in the 1940s and has since become widely used in radio systems and as a common type of video connector. It has a twist-to-lock design, where two lugs on the female connector engage slots in the shell of the male one.

BNC is designed to maintain the characteristic impedance of the cable across the connection, and is made in 50-ohm and 75-ohm versions. It is normally used for radio-frequency signals up to about 2 gigahertz and 500 volts.

Similar radio-frequency connectors differ in dimensions and attachment features, and may allow for higher voltages, higher frequencies, or three-wire connections.

== History ==
In 1941, the US Navy used a smaller version of the threaded N connector, the Type BN (Baby N), as the UG-85/U, UG-86/U, UG-114/U and UG-115/U.

In 1943, the British introduced a ¼ inch 50 ohm coaxial cable, and companies immediately developed many connectors for it. In 1944, the US Navy called the designers together to find a single, standard design acceptable to all. Paul Neill, the inventor of the original N connector, developed a prototype connector which had approximately a 50 ohm impedance at frequencies beyond 1 GHz, used a bayonet fastening (faster to use than a threaded one), and was easier to manufacture and assemble. It was specified by the Bell Laboratory drawing ESL 662916, dated March 2, 1944.

In May 1945, Octavio M. Salati of Hazeltine Corporation applied for a patent for the BNC, which was granted in January 1951. In 1958, Hazeltine sued Dage Electric Company, a maker of BNC connectors, for infringement on this patent. The court found that Salati’s patent was invalid because it was shown that the Navy’s BNC existed before his application date.

== Name ==
The term BNC appeared in 1948 in ads for Amphenol connectors together with the MIL-spec name UG-88/U.

While Carl Concelman was not involved in the development of the BNC, it is often suggested that BNC means Bayonet Neill–Concelman. At the time of the BNC development, Concelman worked at Danbury Knudsen and invented the C connector as an improvement to the BNC. In the late 1950s, at Amphenol, Neill and Concelman invented the TNC connector, which could mean Threaded BNC or Threaded Neill–Concelman. This may have led some to incorrectly assume that they must also have developed the BNC and created Bayonet Neill–Concelman as a backronym.

Other suggestions include Bayonet Navy Connector: Bayonet N Connector, Bayonet Nut Coupling, Barrel Nut Connector, Bayonet Nipple Connector, Baby N Connector, British Naval/National Connector, and Berkeley Nucleonics Corporation.

== Description ==
The BNC connector features two bayonet lugs on the female connector; mating is fully achieved with a quarter turn of the coupling nut. It uses an outer conductor with slots and some plastic dielectric on each gender connector. This dielectric causes increasing losses at higher frequencies. Above 4 GHz, the slots may radiate signals, so the connector is usable, but not necessarily stable, up to about 11 GHz. BNC connectors are made to match the characteristic impedance of cable at either 50 ohms or 75 ohms (with other impedances such as 93 ohms for ARCNET available though less common). They are usually applied for frequencies below 4 GHz and voltages below 500 volts. The interface specifications for the BNC and many other connectors are referenced in MIL-STD-348.

== Usage ==
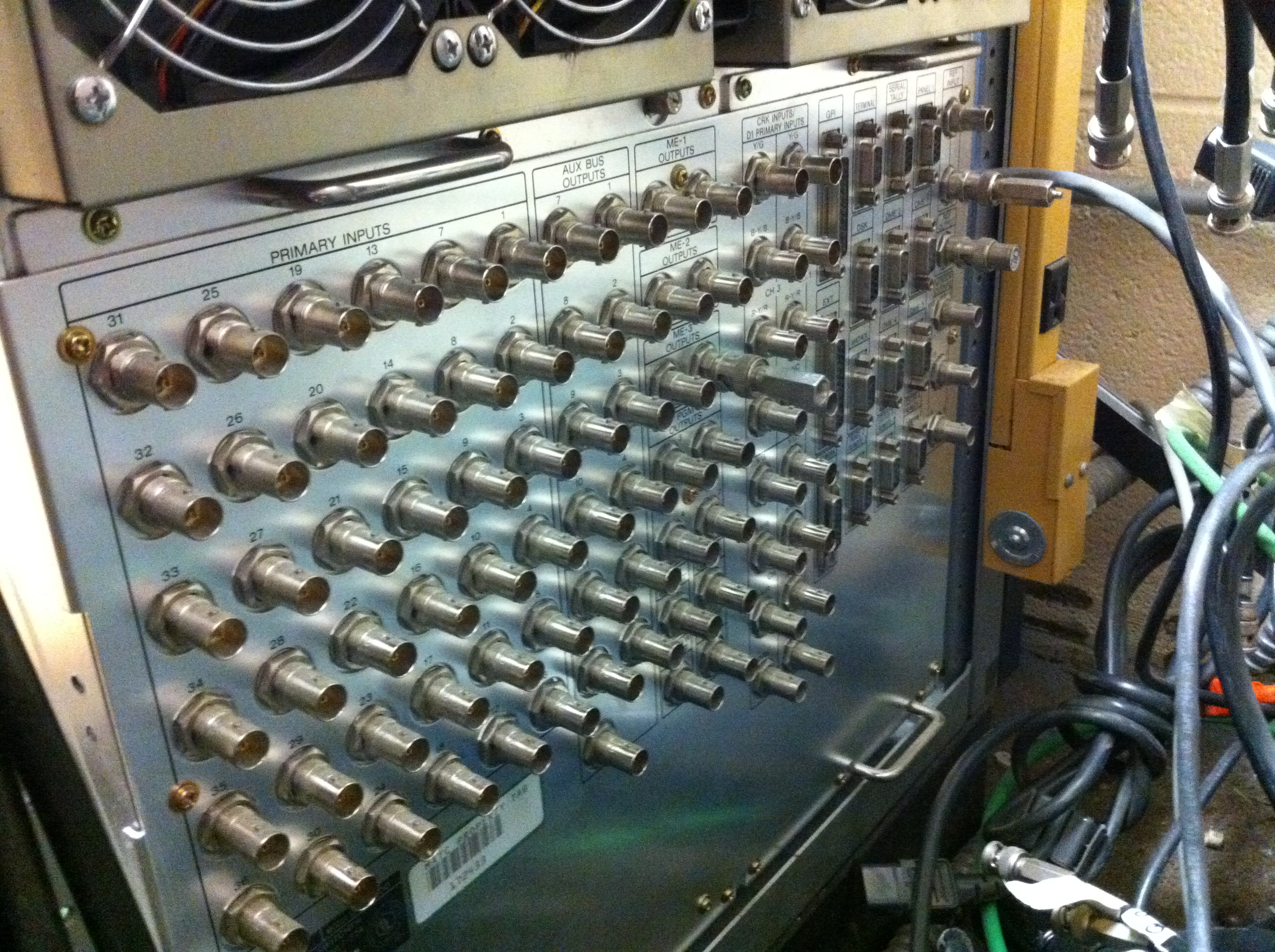
Rear of a video switcher with an array of BNC connectors

The BNC was originally designed for military use and has gained wide acceptance in video and RF applications up to 2 GHz. BNC connectors are used with miniature-to-subminiature coaxial cable in radio, television, and other radio-frequency electronic equipment. They were commonly used for early computer networks, including ARCnet, the IBM PC Network, and the 10BASE2 variant of Ethernet.

The BNC connector is used for signal connections such as:

- analog and serial digital interface video signals
- radio antennas
- aerospace electronics (avionics)
- nuclear instrumentation
- test equipment

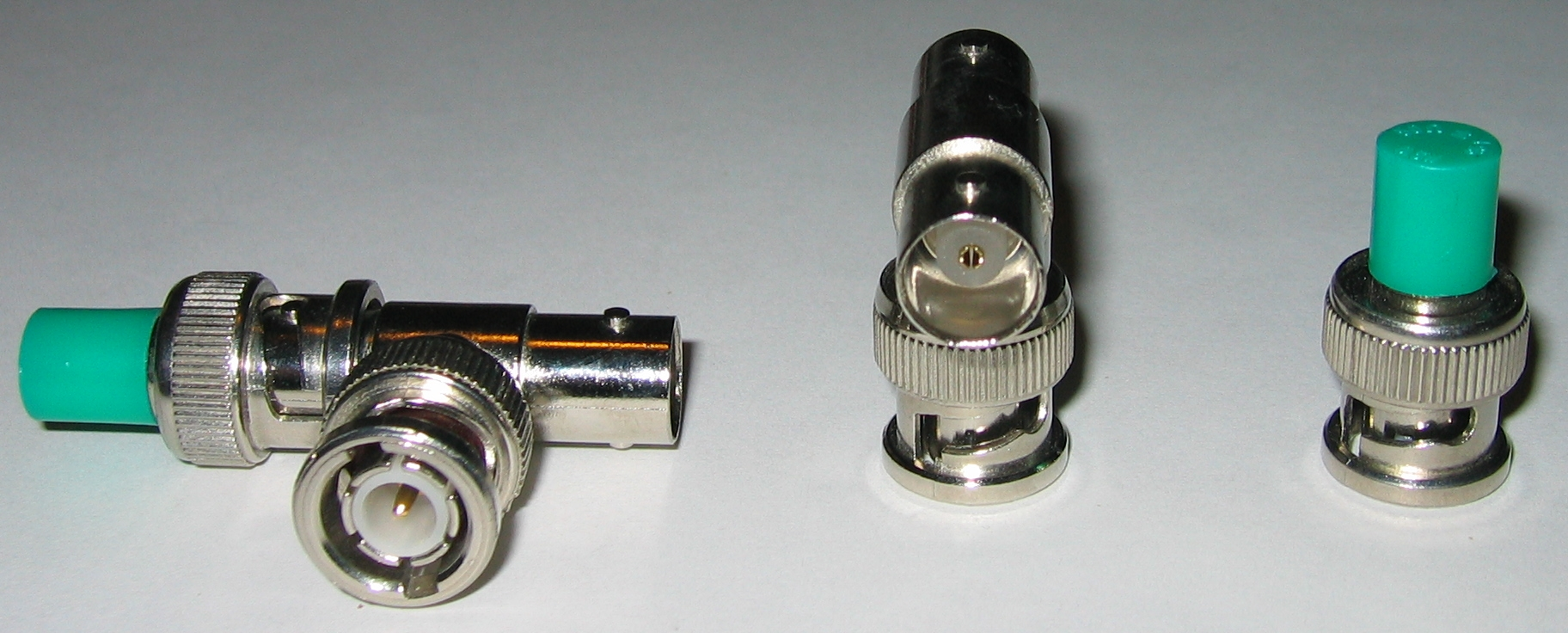
BNC tee connectors with resistive load terminators

The BNC connector is used for analog composite video and digital video interconnects on commercial video devices. Consumer electronics devices with RCA connector jacks can be used with BNC-only commercial video equipment by inserting an adapter. BNC connectors were commonly used on 10base2 thin Ethernet network cables and network cards. BNC connections can also be found in recording studios. Digital recording equipment uses the connection for synchronization of various components via the transmission of word clock timing signals.

Typically the male connector is fitted to a cable, and the female to a panel on equipment. Cable connectors are often designed to be fitted by crimping using a special power or manual tool. Wire strippers which strip outer jacket, shield braid, and inner dielectric to the correct lengths in one operation are used.

== Types and compatibility ==
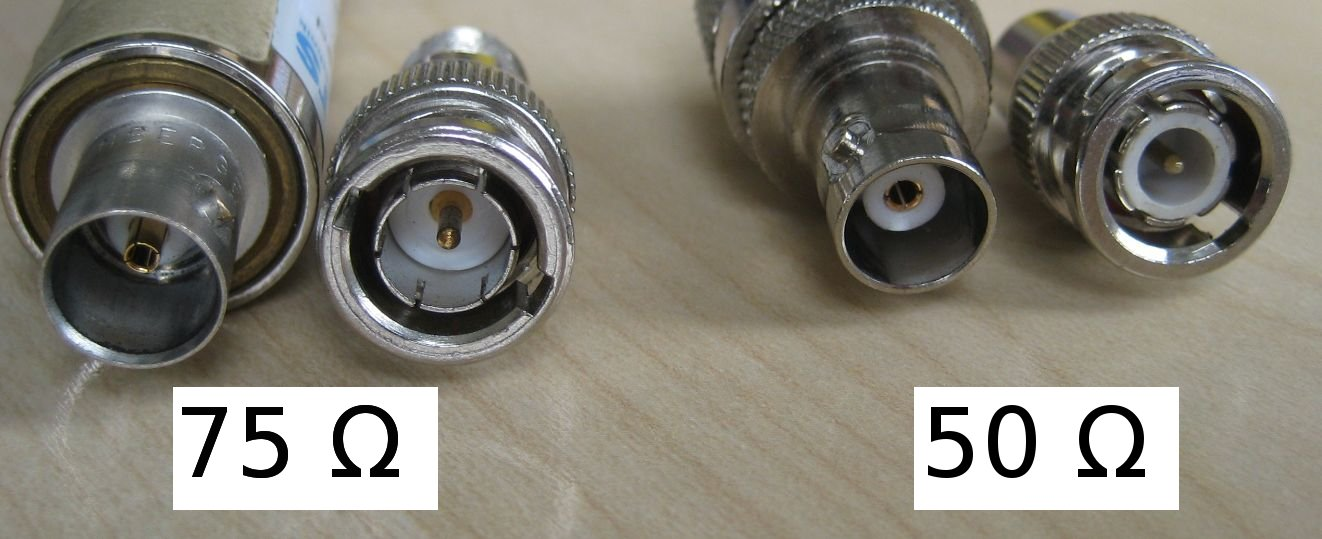
BNC connectors. From left to right: 75 Ω female, 75 Ω male, 50 Ω female, 50 Ω male.

=== Types ===
BNC connectors are most commonly made in 50 and 75 ohm versions, matched for use with cables of the same characteristic impedance. The 75 ohm types can sometimes be recognized by the reduced or absent dielectric in the mating ends but this is by no means reliable. There was a proposal in the early 1970s for the dielectric material to be coloured red in 75 ohm connectors, and while this is occasionally implemented, it did not become standard. The 75 ohm connector has slightly different dimensions from the 50 ohm variant, but the two can nevertheless be made to mate. Note that if a male 50 ohm connector has its pin larger than that of a 75 ohm one then it can widen the female, causing a faulty connection when a 75 ohm connector is inserted later. The 50 ohm connectors are typically specified for use at frequencies up to 4 GHz and the 75 ohm version up to 2 GHz.

Video (particularly HD video signals) and DS3 Telco central office applications primarily use 75 ohm BNC connectors, whereas 50 ohm connectors are used for data and RF. Many VHF receivers used 75 ohm antenna inputs, so they often used 75 ohm BNC connectors.

Reverse-polarity BNC (RP-BNC) is a variation of the BNC specification which reverses the polarity of the interface. In a connector of this type, the female contact normally found in a jack is usually in the plug, while the male contact normally found in a plug is in the jack. This ensures that reverse polarity interface connectors do not mate with standard interface connectors. The SHV connector is a high-voltage BNC variant that uses this reverse polarity configuration.

Smaller versions of the BNC connector, called Mini BNC and High-Density BNC (HD-BNC), are manufactured by Amphenol. While retaining the electrical characteristics of the original specification, they have smaller footprints giving a higher packing density on circuit boards and equipment backplanes. These connectors have true 75 ohm impedance making them suitable for HD video applications.

=== Compatibility ===
The different versions are designed to mate with each other, and 75 ohm and 50 ohm BNC connectors that comply with the 2007 IEC standard, IEC 61169-8, will mate non-destructively. At least one manufacturer claims very high reliability for the connectors' compatibility.

At frequencies below 10 MHz the impedance mismatch between a 50 ohm connector or cable and a 75 ohm one has negligible effects. BNC connectors were thus originally made only in 50 ohm versions, for use with any impedance of cable. Above this frequency, however, the mismatch becomes progressively more significant and can lead to signal reflections.

== BNC inserter/remover tool ==
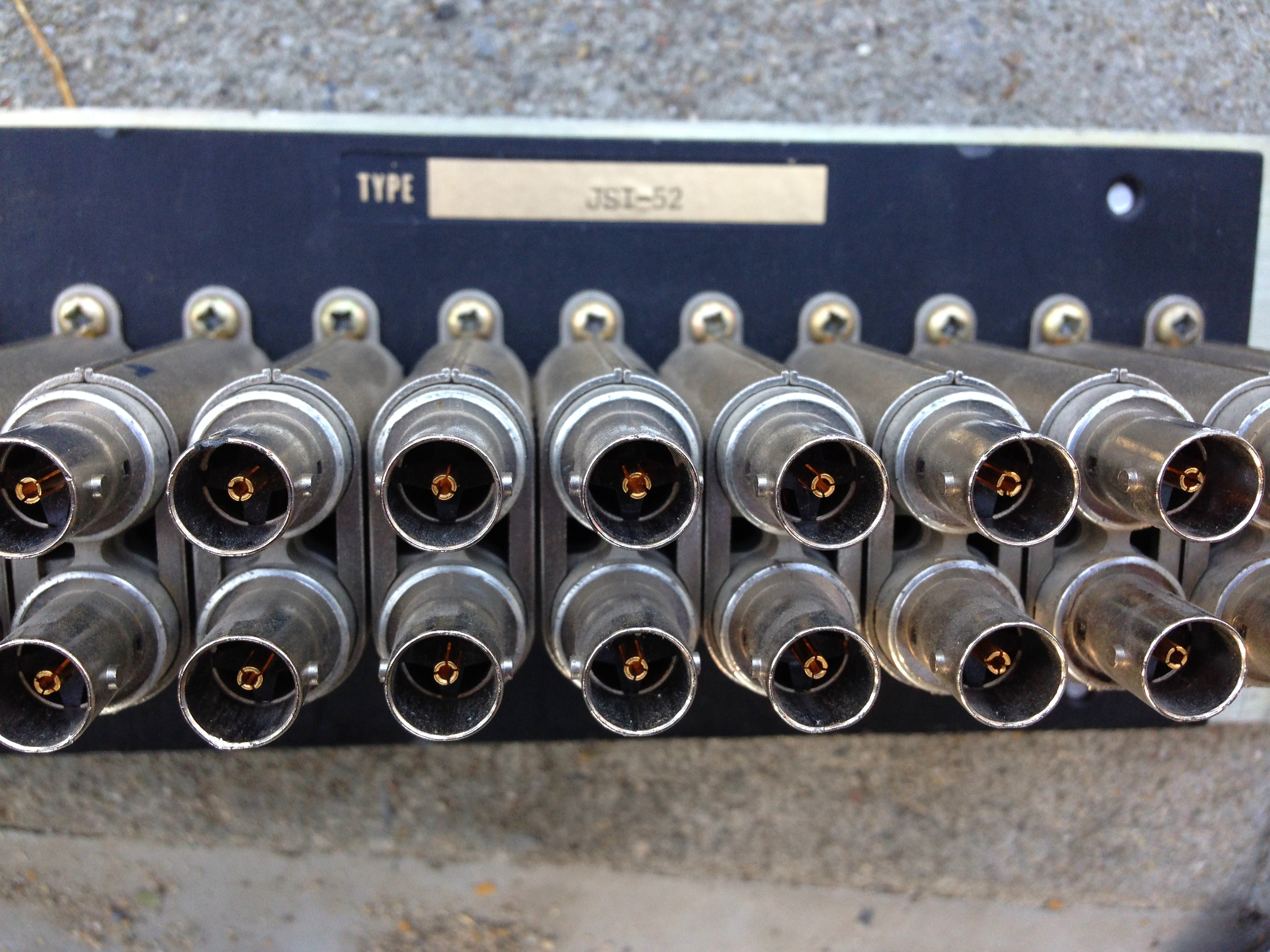
Rear view of a patch panel with BNC jacks in close proximity.

A BNC inserter/remover tool, also called a BNC tool, BNC extraction tool, BNC wrench, or BNC apple corer, is a tool used to insert or remove BNC connectors in high density or hard-to-reach locations, such as densely wired patch panels in broadcast facilities like central apparatus rooms.

BNC tools are usually light weight, made of stainless steel, and have screw driver type plastic handle grips for applying torque. Their shafts are usually double the length of a standard connector.

They help to safely, efficiently and quickly connect and disconnect BNC connectors in jack fields. BNC tools facilitate access and minimize the risk of accidentally disconnecting nearby connectors.

== Similar connectors ==
Similar connectors using the bayonet connection principle exist, and a threaded connector is also available. United States military standard MIL-PRF-39012 entitled Connectors, Coaxial, Radio Frequency, General Specification for (formerly MIL-C-39012) covers the general requirements and tests for radio frequency connectors used with flexible cables and certain other types of coaxial transmission lines in military, aerospace, and spaceflight applications.

=== SR connectors ===
In the USSR, BNC connectors were copied as SR connectors. As a result of recalculating from imperial to metric measurements their dimensions differ slightly from those of BNC. They are however generally interchangeable with them, sometimes with force applied.

=== TNC (Threaded Neill–Concelman) ===
A threaded version of the BNC connector, known as the TNC connector (for Threaded Neill-Concelman) is also available. It has superior performance to the BNC connector at microwave frequencies.

=== Twin BNC or twinax ===
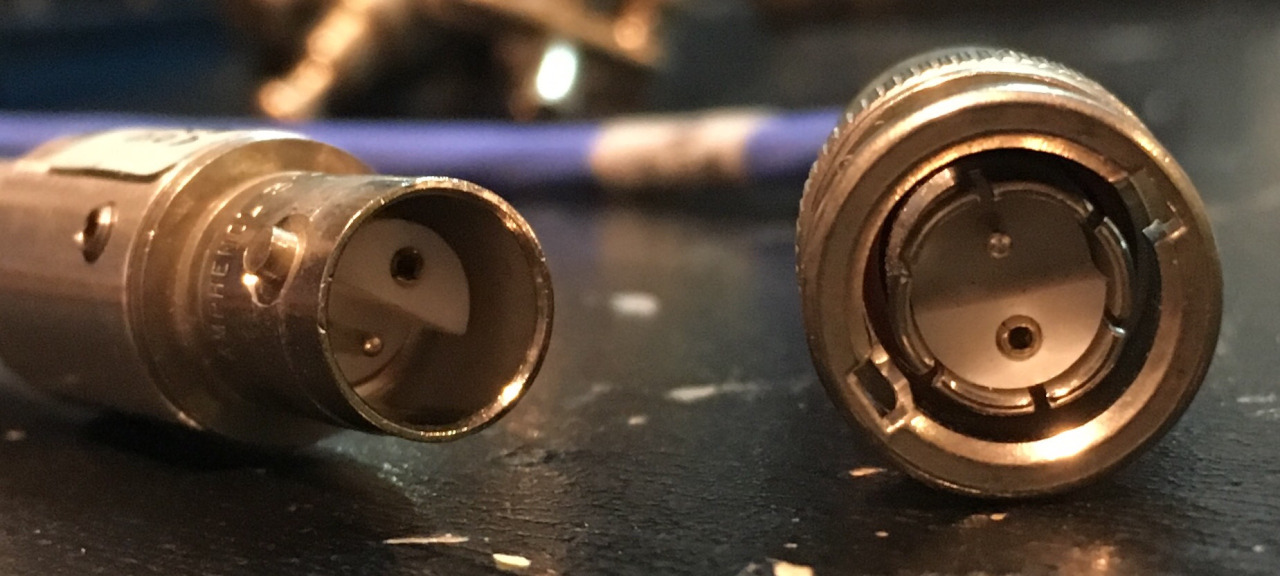
Female (left) and male (right) twin BNC connectors

Twin BNC (also known as twinax) connectors use the same bayonet latching shell as an ordinary BNC connector but contain two independent contact points (one male and one female), allowing the connection of a 78 ohm or 95 ohm shielded differential pair such as RG-108A. They can operate up to 100 MHz and 100 volts. They cannot mate with ordinary BNC connectors. An abbreviation for twinax connectors has been BNO (Huber+Suhner).

=== Triaxial ===
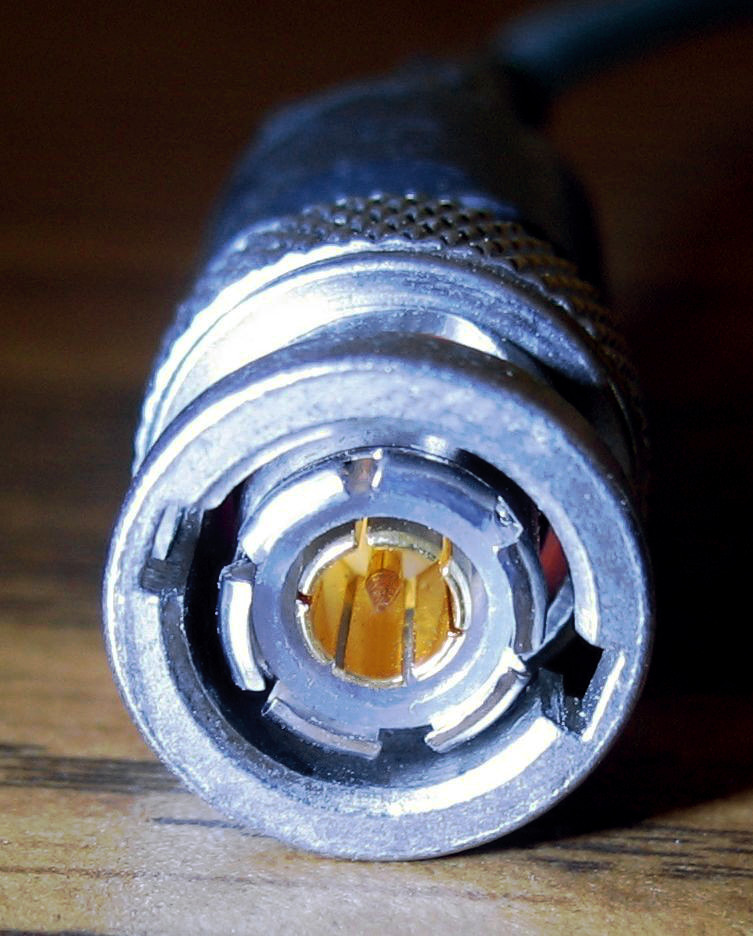
Triaxial BNC connector

Triaxial (also known as triax) connectors are a variant on BNC that carry a signal and guard as well as ground conductor. These are used in sensitive electronic measurement systems. Early triaxial connectors were designed with just an extra inner conductor, but later triaxial connectors also include a three-lug arrangement to rule out an accidental forced mating with a BNC connector. Adaptors exist to allow some interconnection possibilities between triaxial and BNC connectors. The triaxial may also be known as a Trompeter connection.

=== High-voltage connectors ===
For higher voltages (above 500 V), MHV and SHV connectors are typically used. MHV connectors are easily mistaken for BNC type, and can be made to mate with them by brute force. The SHV connector was developed as a safer alternative: it will not mate with ordinary BNC connectors, and the inner conductor is much harder to accidentally contact.

=== Miniature connectors ===
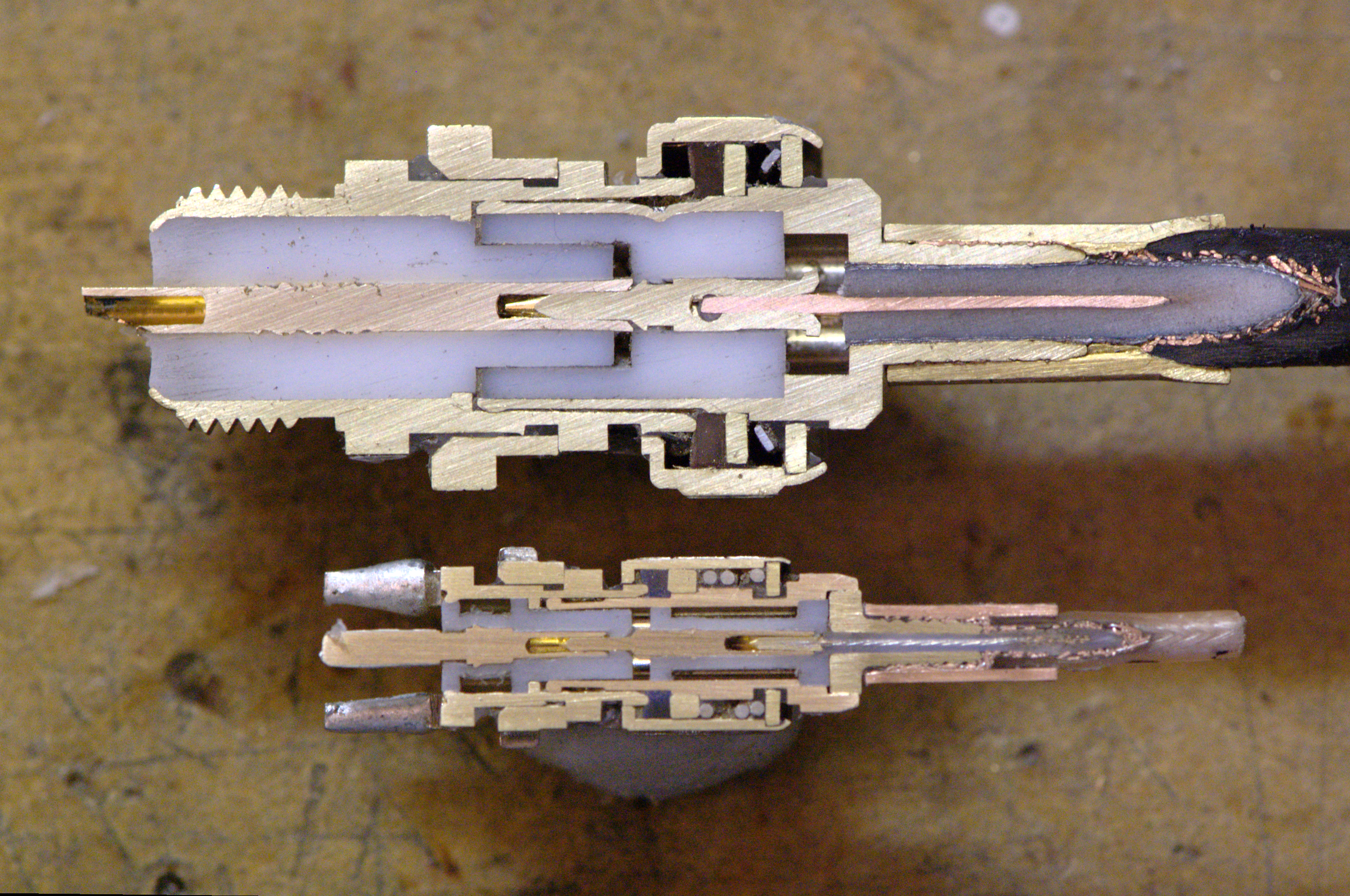
Section through BNC and HD-BNC connectors

BNC connectors are commonly used in electronics, but in some applications they are being replaced by LEMO 00 miniature connectors which allow for significantly higher densities. In video broadcast industry, the DIN 1.0/2.3 and the HD-BNC connector are used for higher density products

== See also ==
- SMA connector
- SMB connector
- SMC connector
- UHF connector
