= UHF connector =

Type of radio frequency connector

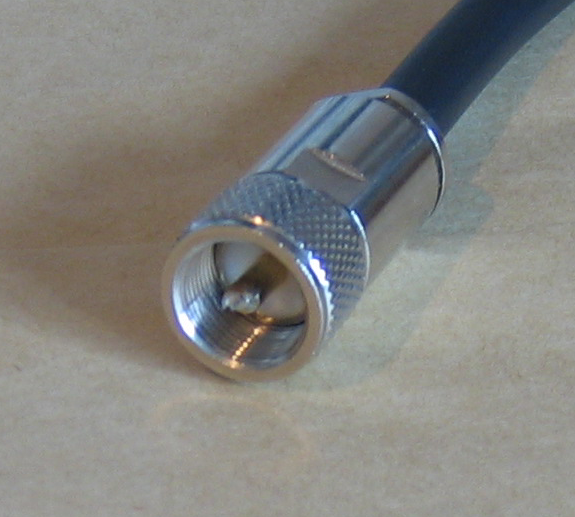
- PL-259 (male) plug. Outside diameter is about 18 mm.
- Type: RF coaxial connector

Production history
- Designed: 1930s
- Manufacturer: Various

General specifications
- Diameter: 18 mm (0.71 in) (typical)
- Cable: Coaxial
- Passband: Typically 0–100 MHz
- Connector: SO-239 (socket); PL-259 (plug)

Electrical
- Signal: Non-constant impedance
- Max. voltage: 500 volts peak

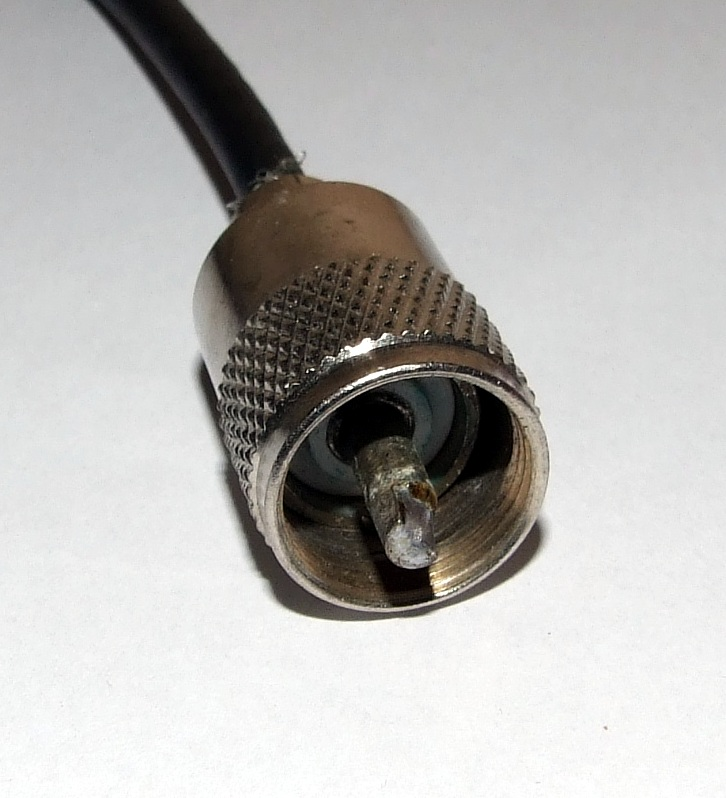
"Classic" UHF connector with a soldered center pin. The fringe of braided shielding at the rear has not been completely trimmed away.

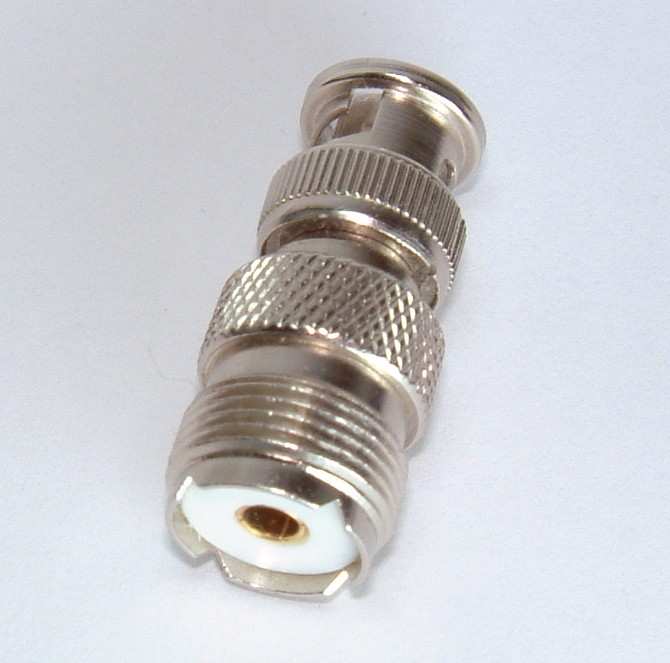
Adaptor from SO-239 (foreground) to BNC (background).

The UHF connector is a name for a fairly common, but old type of threaded RF connector. The connector design was invented in the 1930s for use in the radio industry. It is a widely used standard connector for HF transmission lines on full-sized radio equipment, with BNC connectors predominating for smaller, hand-held equipment.

The name "UHF" is a source of confusion, since the name of the connectors did not change when the frequency ranges were renamed. The design was named during an era when "UHF" meant frequencies over 30 MHz. Today, the meaning of the term ultra high frequency (UHF) is instead defined to be frequencies between 300 MHz and 3 GHz (Note: Since the latter part of the 20th century, the term "UHF" has been formally defined as the band of frequencies between 300 MHz and 3 GHz, in both the ITU and IEEE official designations for radio bands.) and the frequencies formerly called UHF are now called very high frequency (VHF).

Unlike modern connector designs that replaced it, no active specification or standard exists to govern the mechanical and electrical characteristics of the so-called "UHF" connector system, making it effectively a deprecated design with no guarantee for suitability to an electrical or mechanical purpose. There is evidence of inconsistency in performance of marketed UHF connectors. Testing reveals connector designs introduced after WWII, such as N connector and BNC connector, are electrically superior to the 'UHF' connector for modern UHF frequencies. Other testing showed that one sample of UHF connectors had negligible ill effects on signals for frequencies up to 435 MHz.

== Other names ==
The connector reliably carries signals at frequencies up to 100 MHz. The coupling shell has a 5/ 8 inch 24 tpi UNEF standard thread. The most popular cable plug and corresponding chassis-mount socket carry the old Signal Corps labels PL-259 (plug #259) and SO-239 (socket #239). These are also known as Navy type 49190 and 49194, respectively. (Note: A double-ended SO-239 connector is designated as an SO-238.)

PL-259, SO-239, PL-258, and several other related labels used by military services refer to one specific mechanical design, now collectively called UHF connectors, continuing the use of the now-obsolete meaning of 'UHF'. (Note: In some countries, for example in Israel, the term PL connector is confusingly associated rather with the analog phone connector.) The designations come from the Joint Electronics Type Designation System, its predecessor, the AN system, and the earlier SCR (Set, Complete, Radio) system.

== Characteristics ==
=== Mechanical ===
By design, all connectors in the UHF connector family mate using the 5/ 8 inch 24 tpi threaded shell for the shield connection and an approximately 0.156 inch-diameter (4 mm) pin and socket for the inner conductor. Similar connectors (M connectors) with an incompatible 16 mm diameter, 1 mm metric thread have been produced, but those are not standard UHF connectors defined by the patent and military specifications.

=== Surge impedance ===
UHF connectors have a non-constant surge impedance. For this reason, UHF connectors are generally usable through HF and the lower portion of what is now known as the VHF frequency range. Despite the name, the UHF connector is rarely used in high performance applications for today's UHF band, as the non-constant surge impedance creates measurable electrical signal reflections above 100 MHz.

Virtually all of the impedance bump and consequent loss is in the UHF female connector, the SO-239. A typical SO-239 UHF female, properly hooded, has a difference in impedance from the standard 50 Ohm line impedance of about 35 Ohms. The length of the bump is typically 1/ 2 inch, where the female pin flares to fit over the male pin. This bump can be mitigated by using a honeycomb dielectric in the female pin area to raise the impedance to about 46 Ohm. Many VHF / UHF amateur operators use special UHF female connectors that maintain a 50 ohm surge impedance.

=== Power ===
Some samples of UHF connectors can handle peak RF power levels well over 1 kilowatt based on the peak voltage rating of 500 V. In practice, some UHF connector products will handle over 4 kV peak voltage. Manufacturers typically test and warrant UHF jumpers in the 3–5 kV range. UHF connectors are standard on HF amateur amplifiers rated at 1500^{+} Watt output.

In practice, voltage limit is set by the air gap between center and shield. The center pin diameter and contact area is large enough that pin heating is not an issue. UHF connectors are generally limited by cable heating rather than connector failure.

=== Environmental tolerance ===
The UHF connector is not weatherproof.

== Applications ==
In many applications, UHF connectors were replaced by later connector designs that have a more nearly uniform surge impedance over the length of the connection, such as the N connector and the BNC connector. UHF connectors are still widely used in amateur radio, citizens' band radio, and marine VHF radio applications.

UHF connectors were also used from the 1950s until the late 1970s on television broadcast and video equipment for composite and component video signals, having been mostly superseded by the late 1970s by BNC connectors on professional and industrial video gear, and by the RCA connector on consumer video hardware.

== See also ==
- Miniature UHF connector
- RF connector
