= MHV =

MHV may refer to:

- MHV Amplitudes (particle physics) - maximally helicity violating amplitudes
- MHV connector (electronics) - miniature high voltage RF connector
- Mojave Air & Space Port, FAA and IATA code
- Mouse hepatitis virus
