= SMC connector =

Coaxial RF connectors developed in the 1960s

SMC
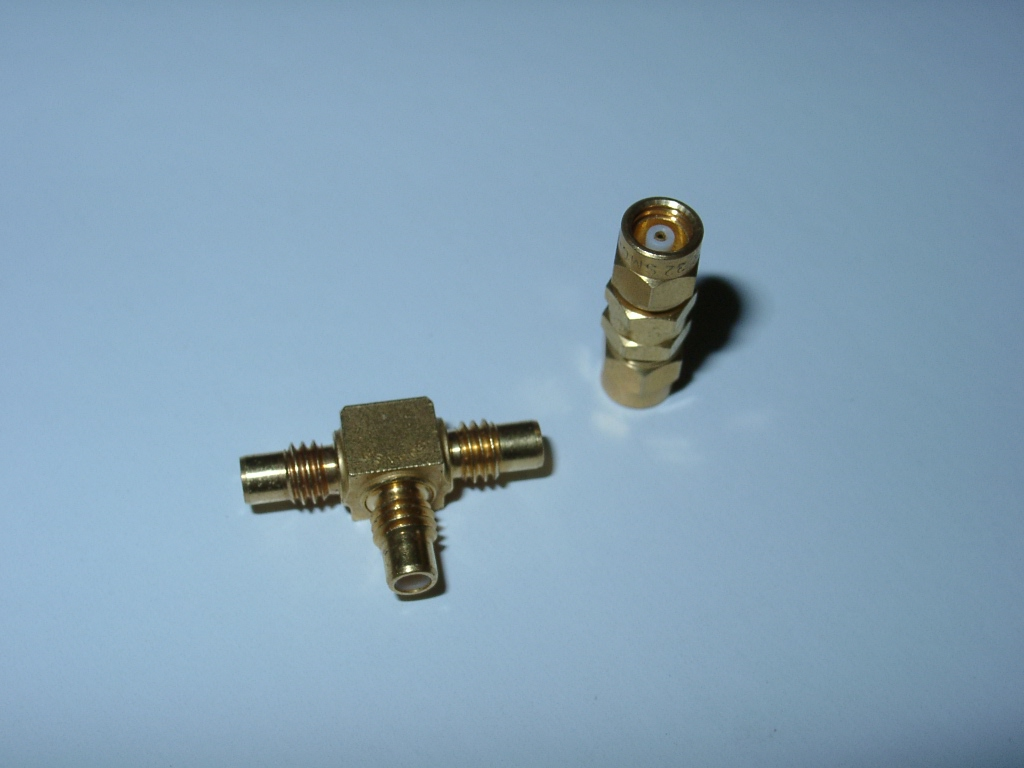
- SMC Connectors: 3-way Male, and Female-to-Female.
- Type: RF coaxial connector

Production history
- Designed: 1960s
- Manufacturer: Various
- Cable: Coaxial
- Passband: Typically 0–4 GHz

Electrical
- Signal: 50-ohm and 75-ohm

SMC (SubMiniature version C) connectors are coaxial RF connectors developed in the 1960s. The interface specifications for the SMC and many other connectors are referenced in MIL-STD-348. They use a #10-32 UNF threaded interface (a screw type). They offer electrical performance from direct current (DC) to 4 GHz. Some extended performance versions are rated to 10 GHz. The normally free part (a.k.a. plug) of a SMC connector that has a socket for the centre contact are the female connectors. The normally fixed part (a.k.a. jack) SMC connectors that has a pin for the centre contact are the male connectors. This is the reverse of most RF connectors. SMC jack connectors have an external thread while SMC plug connectors have the mating hex nut. The contact dimensions are identical to the snap-fit SMB. Available in 50 ohm and 75 ohm characteristic impedance, they provide an interconnect means for small form factor coaxial cables (e.g. 50 ohm RG-174, 75 ohm RG-179) and printed circuit boards where small footprint is important.

The term Subvis connector appears to be a European usage; the connectors appear to be electrically and mechanically equivalent to SMC.

== See also ==
- SMA connector, SMB connector
- BNC connector, TNC connector, N connector
