= Miniature UHF connector =

Mini-UHF connectors are miniaturized versions of UHF connectors, designed primarily for use in bag-type mobile phones and similar applications where size is an important consideration. Introduced in the 1970s, Mini-UHF has a 3/8-24 thread size and operates up to 2.5 GHz. It is similar only in basic construction, a threaded outer portion, center pin, and toothed ends intended to prevent twisting and loosening. Its performance is much better than the standard UHF.

== See also ==
- UHF connector
