= C connector =

Type of RF connector

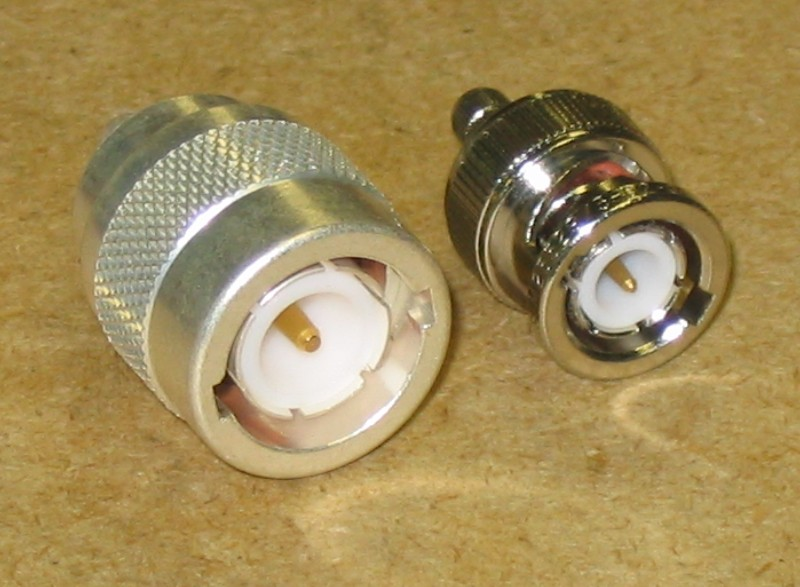
- C connector on the left beside smaller BNC
- Type: RF coaxial connector

Production history
- Designer: Carl Concelman
- Manufacturer: Various

General specifications
- Diameter: Male: 0.750 in (1.91 cm); Female: 0.600 in (1.52 cm) (outer, typical)
- Cable: Coaxial
- Passband: Typically 0–11 GHz

The C connector is a type of RF connector used for terminating coaxial cable. The interface specifications for the C and many other connectors are referenced in MIL-STD-348. The connector uses two-stud bayonet-type locks. The C connector was invented by Amphenol engineer Carl Concelman. It is weatherproof without being overly bulky. The mating arrangement is similar to that of the BNC connector. It can be used up to 11 GHz, and is rated for up to 1500 volts.

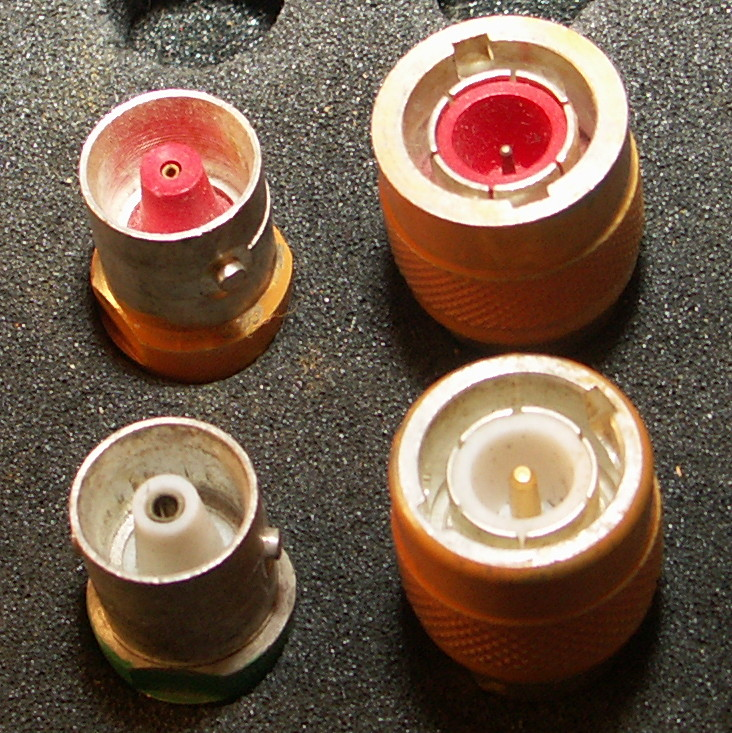
Picture comparing 75 ohm (top) and 50 ohm (bottom) C connectors

== See also ==
- USB-C (also called Type C connector)
