= Paul Neill =

American electrical engineer (1882–1968)

Paul Neill (September 6, 1882 – October 1968) was an American electrical engineer at Bell Labs in the 1940s. He is credited with helping to invent the TNC, Type N, and BNC connectors used for microwave and RF communications. He joined Bell in 1916 after spending 12 years at the Westinghouse Electric Company. He retired from Bell on September 30, 1947.

== See also ==
- RF connector
- Carl Concelman
