= MHV connector =

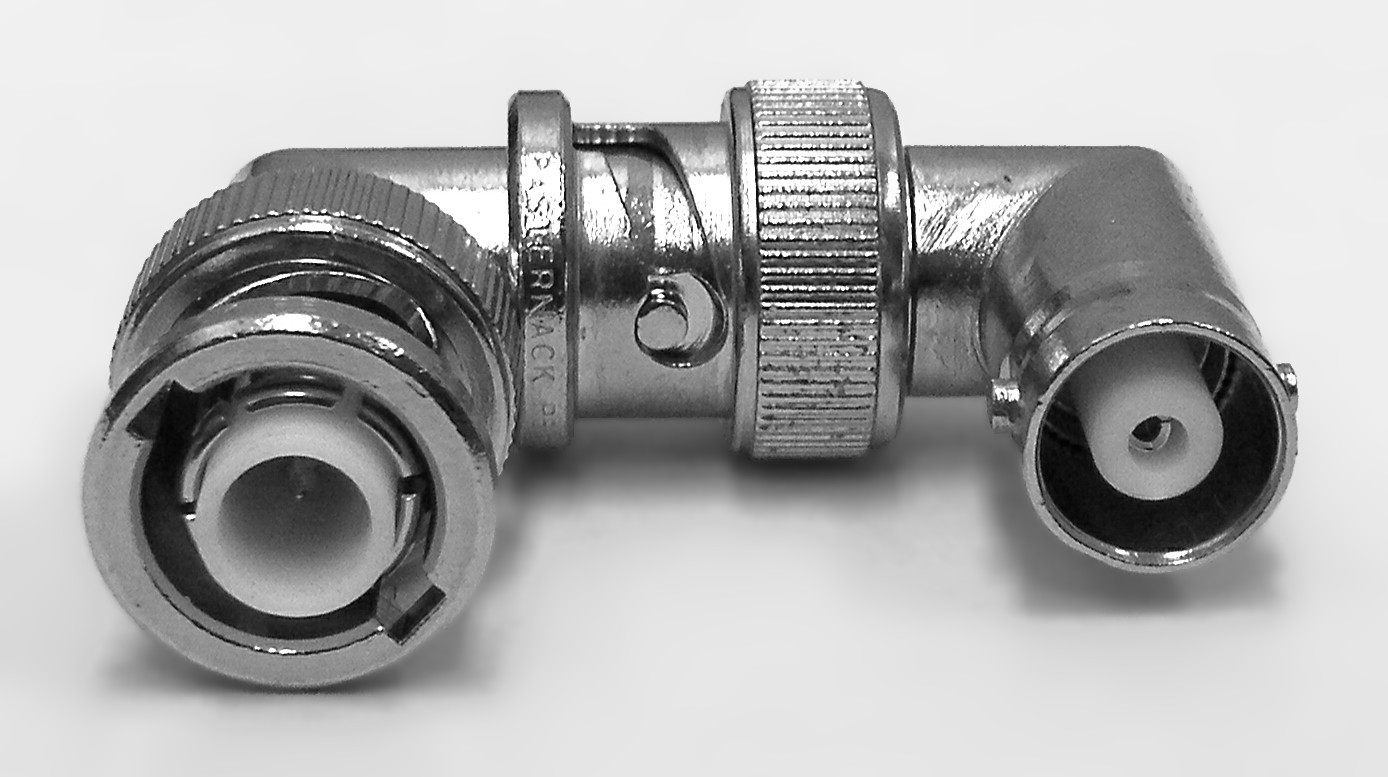
- Two coupled MHV elbows showing both plug and jack ends.
- Type: RF coaxial connector

Production history
- Manufacturer: Various

General specifications
- Diameter: Male: 0.385 in (0.98 cm) (inner, bayonet); Female: 0.378 in (0.96 cm) (outer, typical)
- Cable: Coaxial
- Passband: Typically 0–300 MHZ

Electrical
- Max. voltage: 5000Vpk
- Max. current: 3A

The MHV (miniature high voltage) connector is a type of RF connector used for terminating coaxial cable.

== Description ==
The connector looks almost identical to a typical BNC connector, but is designed to not mate with BNC jacks. It features two bayonet lugs on the female connector; mating is fully achieved with a quarter turn of the coupling nut. The dimensions of the connector are specified in the MIL-STD-348B. MHV connectors can be recognized by the slightly protruding insulation on the male plug and the slightly different insulation length in the female jack.

== Use ==
The MHV connector is typically rated for 1500 VRMS continuous and 5000 V peak, and 3 amperes. With an operating frequency limited to about 300 MHz their usage is restricted to low frequency applications. It was commonly used in laboratory settings for voltages beyond the rating of BNC connectors. Other applications include:

- Geiger counters
- Scintillation probes
- Transmission lines
- High-voltage power supplies
- Nuclear control instrumentation
- X-ray devices

== Safety hazards ==
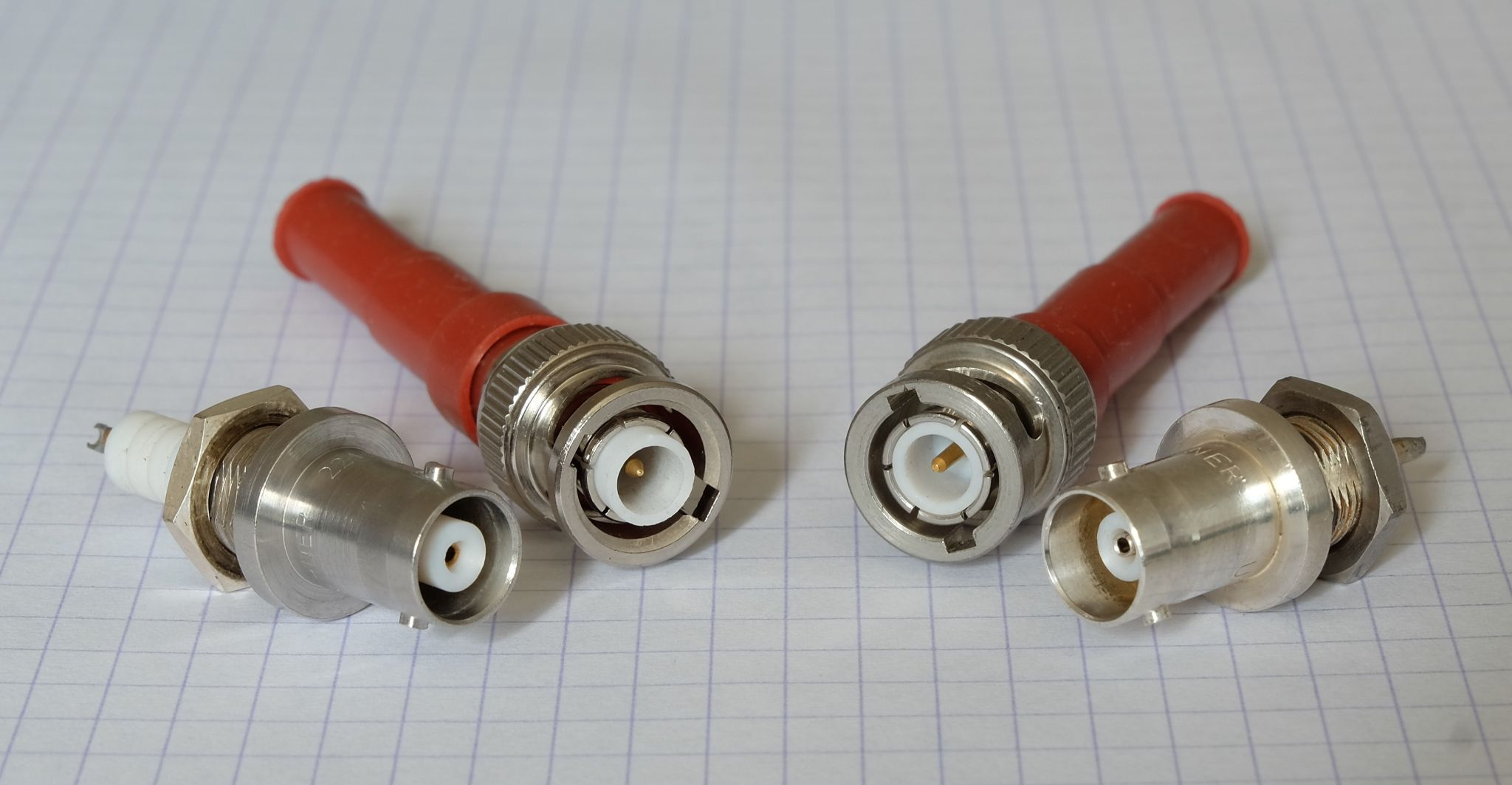
Comparison of male and female MHV connectors (left) with BNC (right)

MHV connectors are a safety hazard because the central pin is close enough to the end to allow accidental contact with it when the connector is not plugged in, and because the ground connection is broken before the power connection when demating.

An additional problem is that MHV connectors are easily mistaken for BNC connectors by users who are unaware of the difference, and MHV and BNC plugs and jacks can be made to mate by brute force. This causes safety hazards, since a user can mate a low voltage cable to a high voltage jack.

SHV connectors are designed to prevent these hazards, and cannot be mated to BNC connectors.
