= Carl Concelman =

American electrical engineer

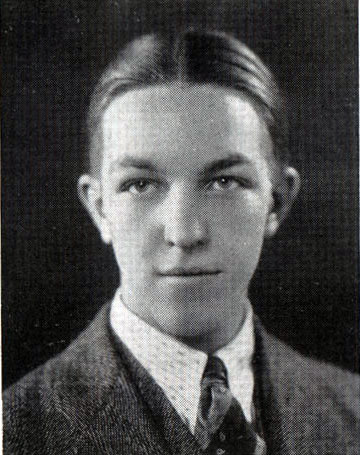
Carl Concelman, 1929

Carl Concelman (December 23, 1912 – August 1975) was the electrical engineer who, while working for Amphenol, invented the C connector and teamed up with Paul Neill of Bell Labs to invent the TNC connector.

== See also ==
- RF connector
