= TNC connector =

Threaded BNC connector

TNC
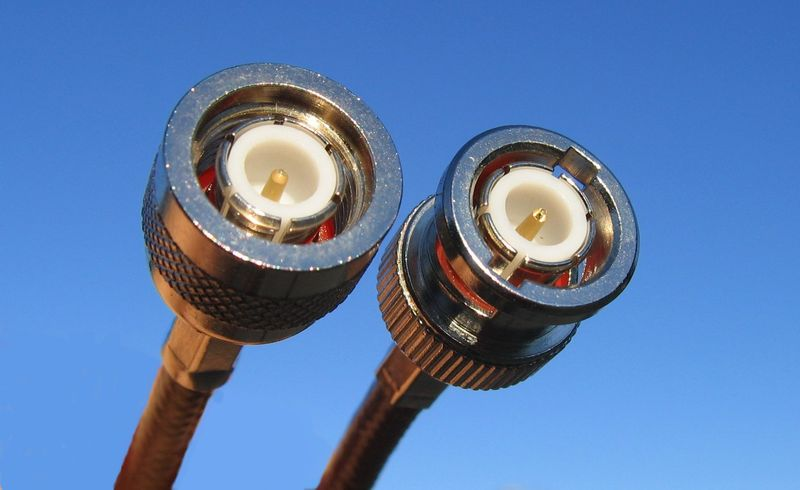
- TNC connector on the left beside BNC.
- Type: RF coaxial connector

Production history
- Designer: Paul Neill and Carl Concelman
- Designed: Late 1950s
- Manufacturer: Various

General specifications
- Diameter: Male: 0.590 in (15.0 mm); Female: 0.378 in (9.6 mm) (outer, typical); Thread 7/16-28 UNEF
- Cable: Coaxial
- Passband: Typically 0–11 GHz

The TNC connector (initialism of "Threaded Neill–Concelman") is a threaded version of the BNC connector.

== Description ==
The interface specifications for the TNC and many other connectors are referenced in MIL-STD-348. The connector has a 50 Ω impedance and operates best in the 0–11 GHz frequency spectrum. It has better performance than the BNC connector at microwave frequencies. Invented in the late 1950s and named after Paul Neill of Bell Labs and Carl Concelman of Amphenol, the TNC connector has been employed in a wide range of radio and wired applications.

The TNC connector features a 7/16"-28 thread, not to be confused with a 7/16 DIN connector, which is the diameter of the mating surfaces as specified in millimeters.

== Variations ==
=== Reverse-polarity TNC ===
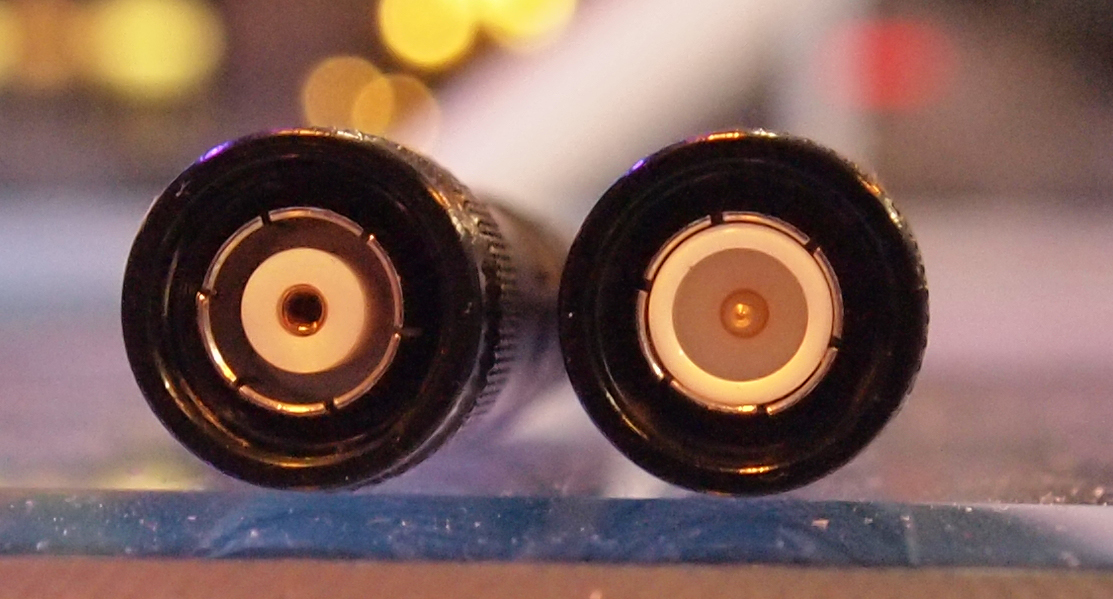
Left, a male RP-TNC connector on a WiFi 2.4GHz antenna. Right, a male TNC connector.

Reverse-polarity TNC (RP-TNC, sometimes RTNC) is a variation of the TNC specification which reverses the polarity of the interface. A reverse polarity connector will have the opposite pin of standard connector. Gender is determined by the threading of the connector. On a male connector, the threading will be on the inside. On a female connector the threading is on the outside.

Because they were not readily available, RP-TNC connectors have been widely used by Wi-Fi equipment manufacturers to comply with specific local regulations, such as those from the FCC, which are designed to prevent consumers from connecting antennas which exhibit gain and therefore breach compliance. The FCC considered that the RP-TNC was acceptable in preventing consumers changing the antenna; but by 2000 it regarded them as readily available, though delaying its ruling indefinitely. As of 2013, leading manufacturers are still using RP-TNC connectors on their Wi-Fi equipment.

=== TNCA ===
The TNCA connector is a variant of the TNC connector specified in MIL-STD-348 designed to provide an air gap in the dielectric region between the male and female connectors. The female TNCA connector is nearly identically to the standard TNC female connector, while the male TNCA connector provides the air cavity differentiating it from a standard male TNC connector. As such, TNCA connectors are mechanically compatible with standard TNC connectors.

=== 75 ohm TNC ===
Most TNC connectors are 50-ohm type even when used with coaxial cable of other impedances, but a 75-ohm series is also available, providing a good SWR to about 1 GHz. These can be recognized by a reduced amount of dielectric in the mating ends. They are intermatable with standard types.

== See also ==
- RF connector
- SMA connector
- SMB connector
- SMC connector
- N connector
- Optical fiber connector
