= BMA =

BMA may stand for:

== Arts and entertainment ==
- Baltimore Museum of Art
- Billboard Music Awards
- Black Market Activities, a record label
- Black Movie Award, annual ceremony
- BMA Magazine, a music magazine published in Canberra, Australia
- Borderless Military Alliance, a fictional organization in the Rideback manga and anime

== Businesses ==
- Battery Manufacturing Association, a British automobile manufacturer
- BermudAir, airline in Bermuda (ICAO airline code)
- BHP Mitsubishi Alliance, Australian mining company
- Black Market Activities, a record label
- British Manufacturers' Association, a former employers' association
- British Midland International, defunct airline in the United Kingdom (ICAO airline code)
- Broaden Media Academy, a film and video training facility in Taipei, Taiwan
- Stockholm Bromma Airport (IATA code BMA)

=== Trades Unions ===
- British Medical Association

== Government and military ==
- Bahamas Maritime Authority
- Bangladesh Military Academy
- Bangkok Metropolitan Administration
- Bermuda Militia Artillery, former unit
- Bermuda Monetary Authority
- British Military Administration (disambiguation) (various meanings)

== Religious organizations ==
- Baptist Missionary Association of America, an association of churches in the United States
- Biblical Mennonite Alliance

== Science and technology ==
- β-Methylamphetamine, a stimulant
- Bayesian model averaging, an ensemble learning method
- Blind mate connector, an RF connector type
- Block-matching algorithm, a system used in computer graphics applications
- B-segment Modular Architecture platform, a modular car platform developed by Geely

== See also ==
- BMAS (disambiguation)
