= Military dictatorship =

Dictatorship ruled by the military

A military dictatorship is a type of dictatorship where supreme power is held and exercised by a member of the armed forces. Military dictatorships are usually led by the commander-in-chief of the military or the leading figure of a military junta. They are most often formed by military coups or by the empowerment of the military through a popular uprising in times of domestic unrest or instability. The military nominally seeks power to restore order or fight corruption, but the personal motivations of military officers will vary.

Modern military dictatorship developed in Latin America during the 19th century, and it expanded in Europe during the early-20th century. It saw a resurgence during the Cold War, and new military dictatorships were established in Africa, Asia, and Latin America in the 1960s. Some scholars have asserted that the number of military dictatorships has declined since the end of the Cold War.

== Formation ==
=== Formation process ===
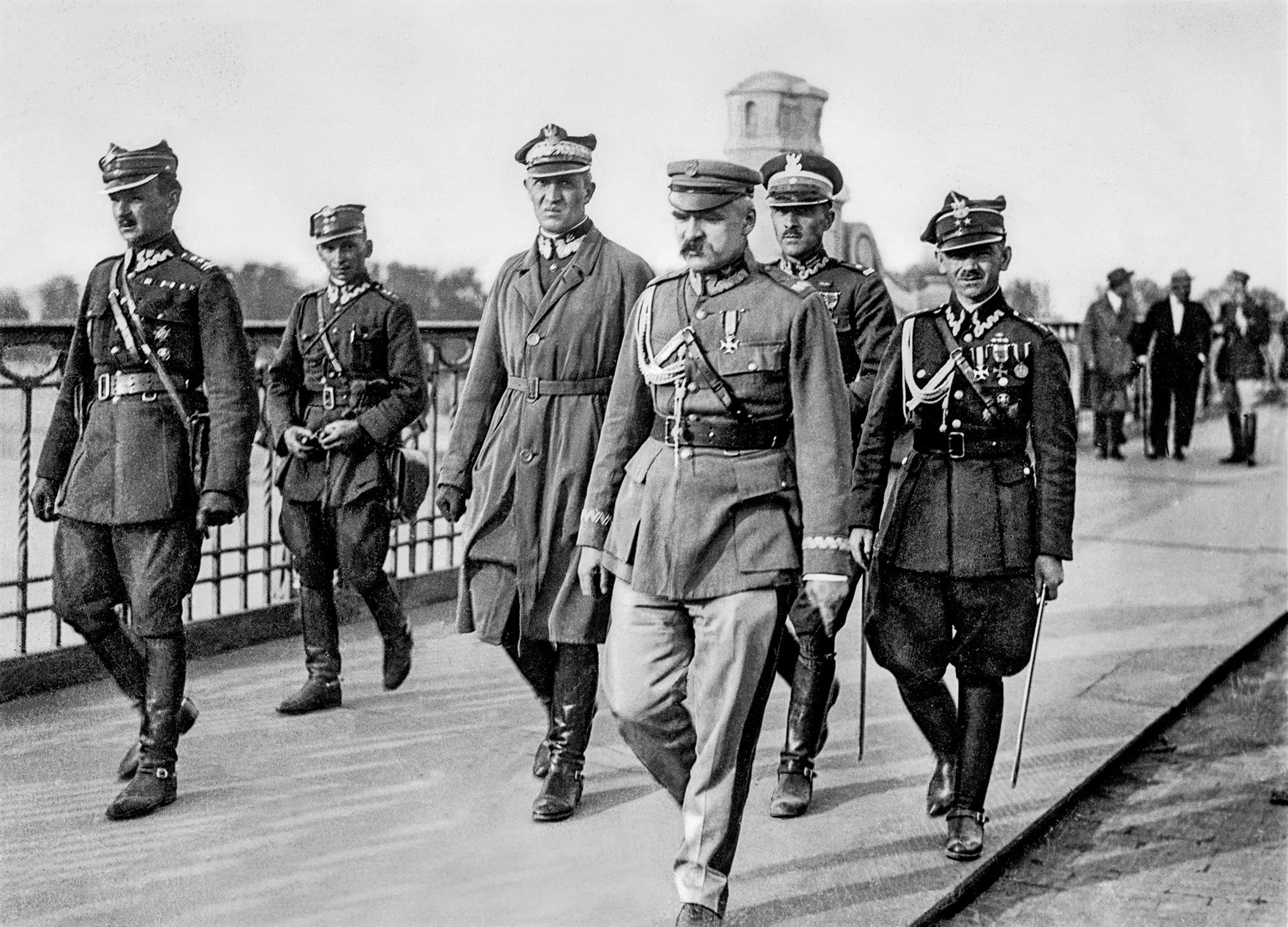
Polish dictator Józef Piłsudski and fellow military officers during the May Coup in 1926

Most military dictatorships are formed after a coup d'état has overthrown the previous government. These coups typically take place when there is a perceived threat to the military or its interests as an institution, including cuts to military funding or civilian interference in military affairs. Military officers have a vested interest in having increased pay and benefits while preventing political intervention in promotions, and failure to address these issues may cause interest in military-led regime change. These coups are most common in the developing world, where a lack of democracy often necessitates such events for changes in leadership.

Not all dictatorships taken through military force are military dictatorships, for in many cases a civilian dictator will take power following a coup and relegate military officers. In other cases, a civilian leader will exceed the powers granted by a constitution with the backing of the military. In some cases, the military is invested with dictatorial powers during a popular uprising. The military is well-equipped to seek and maintain political power, as it is often more modernized than other institutions in a given country, with access to resources and training not available to civil leaders.

A regime can also be formed by an insurgency, or an informal group of militants that attempt to seize power in a government. When insurgents form a dictatorship, they are not constrained by formal military procedures, but their lack of organization can increase the likelihood of opposing factions developing within the group. Insurgencies sometimes grant military titles to their leaders, but they do not adopt the structure of a true military. Regimes created by insurgencies may or may not be recognized as military dictatorships.

Several justifications can be offered by military leadership for seizing power, including improper behavior of the civilian government, a threat of communist takeover, or disorder in politics. These justifications are often given for any formation of military rule, even if the personal motivations of the officers involve greed, ambition, factionalism, or ethnic conflict. An increase of the military budget is a common goal across regimes. As the military is expected to be apolitical, military dictators may consider themselves to be neutral parties who are better fit to maintain stability during times of political crisis. Military rulers will often justify their intervention as a way to protect the people from political repression or as a response to economic failure. In some cases, an active or former military officer will be asked to seize power as a last resort to end the rule of a worse government, though it is not necessarily the case that a military dictatorship brings about the promised improvement and stability.

=== Factors ===
The military's purpose in a given country may affect whether it attempts to seize power. International opponents may prompt stronger national defense. This makes the military more willing to comply with a civilian government as the civilian government is likely to provide for the military. When these opponents are neighboring countries that present territorial threats, however, it can weaken democracy and incentivize the creation of a stronger military. Both of these factors increase the likelihood of a military dictatorship. All of these factors are aggravated in countries with significant natural resources, as these provide an additional financial incentive for the military to seize power. Military dictatorships almost universally form in peacetime, with Kemalist Turkey being the only notable exception by 1980. The economic prosperity of a country does not necessarily indicate the likelihood of military dictatorship.

The previous form of government is also a factor in whether a military dictatorship forms. Democracies are most at risk of becoming military dictatorships shortly after their formation. When a new democracy is formed, the government's institutions are fragile and civil government may not have established control over the military. This impending civilian control of the military provides further incentive for military officers to seize power in newly-formed democracies. Oligarchies prevent military dictatorships by maintaining an equilibrium, keeping the military strong enough to maintain the oligarchy while providing incentives to encourage loyalty.

The risk assessment process for military officers considering dictatorial rule is distinct from that of other potential dictators. Military officers engaging in a coup face lower risks compared to other attempts to establish dictatorships, as most officers are typically allowed to retain their positions if the dictatorship does not survive. Only the military dictator and the highest ranking officers face significant risk. Instead, officers in professionalized militaries will consider the risk to the military in its entirety rather than their individual risk, as institutional risk is much higher.

Some factors can mitigate the chance of a military dictatorship forming that can be implemented in regions where military dictatorships are common. Constitutional provisions can be enacted to enforce penalties for military officers involved in coups, paramilitaries may be created to act independently of the conventional military, military officers may be given positions in civil government, or the military may be reduced in size and resources. Such measures have had mixed success.

== Stability ==
=== Duration ===
The duration and stability of military dictatorships vary considerably, even within a single region, and military dictatorships are generally less stable than other regimes. The average military dictatorship lasts only five years, and the average military dictator is only in power for three years. Military dictatorships struggle to build civilian bases of support through mass political participation or a partisan apparatus, which limits the ability for a regime to establish a stable long-term government. When military dictators are toppled, they are often succeeded by further military coups and new military dictators seizing power within the same regime. The most immediate threats to military dictators are the military officers that they depend on, making long term stability difficult.

Individual military dictators become more secure as they spend more time in office, as they are able to shift power away from military institutions by creating civilian and paramilitary forces to keep them in check. Dictators that do not create these institutions are removed more quickly. Highly professional militaries with coherence and discipline benefit from sharing power between military officers, while less professional militaries often find it necessary to build support among the civilian government. Less professional militaries are less stable, meaning they are more prone to corruption and factionalism.

=== Causes of dissolution ===
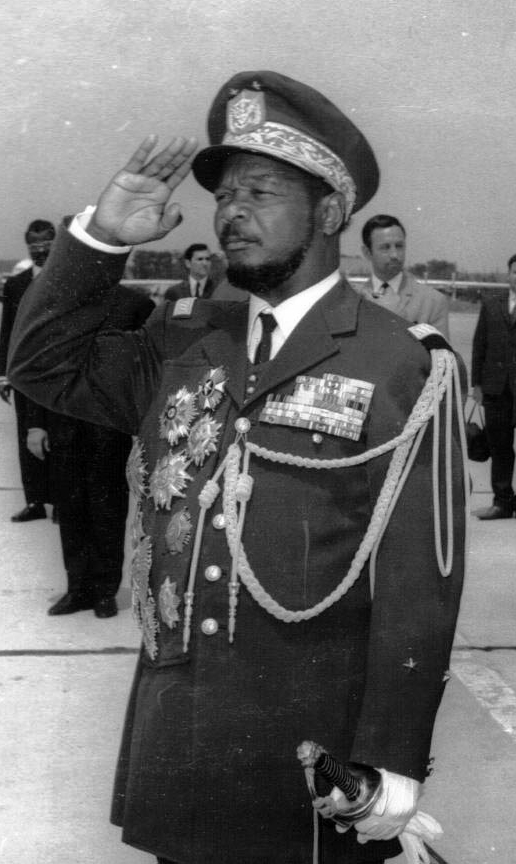
Military dictator Jean-Bédel Bokassa of the Central African Empire was overthrown by a French military invasion.

Military dictatorships are unique among regime types in that those in power often do not wish to remain so. Many military officers will choose to end the military's involvement in politics if it appears to be having a negative effect on the military's cohesion, its legitimacy, or its interests. When politicization leads to factionalism, it can weaken the military's hold on power and discourage leaders from further political involvement. Military rulers are more likely to negotiate and relinquish power willingly than other dictators, as no opposing armed group exists to take power by force, and they typically have the option to return to military life. This allows the leadership to preserve the military as an institution rather than risk its destruction in civil conflict. The legitimacy of a military dictatorship is often contingent on the promise to step down once conditions have been established for a civilian government, and resistance can form against a regime that holds power beyond this point. A prosperous military dictatorship will see increasing calls to restore civilian government as the economy improves.

Military dictatorships are most commonly dissolved following a poor performance in the opinion of elites, causing them to revoke their support for the regime. Civilian demonstrations and strikes rarely have a direct effect on military rule, but widespread public opposition creates opportunities for internal division, and military response against civilians can be destabilizing. Civilian use of force through armed insurgency can also destabilize a military dictatorship, although these are rare. Foreign influence is a common means to end military dictatorship, and powerful countries can end a military regime by exerting diplomatic and economic pressure. This commonly takes place when the dictatorship acts to harm the foreign government or engages in widespread human rights abuses. Foreign countries may also resort to military invasion to end the rule of a military dictator.

=== Democratization ===
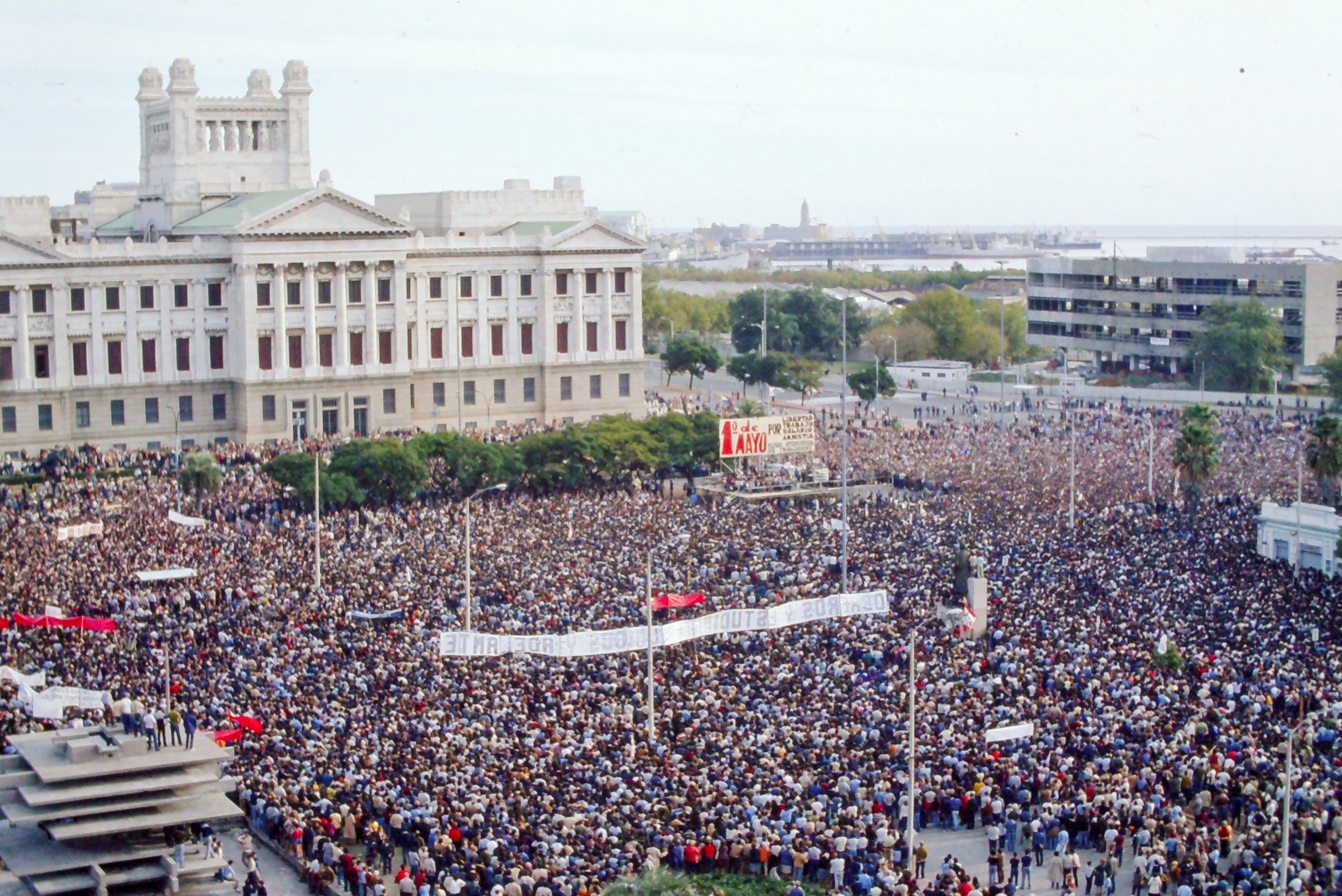
A crowd during the end of the civic-military dictatorship of Uruguay in 1983

As authoritarian regimes, military dictatorships depend on the restriction of democracy to retain power. The centralization of power and the restriction of liberties such as freedom of speech and due process prevent democratic institutions from developing. Despite these restrictions, military dictatorships are more likely to democratize than other forms of dictatorship, particularly if power has not consolidated in the hands of a single officer. Public support for democracy is taken more seriously by military dictatorships than in other regimes, and public unrest may prompt a military dictatorship to initiate democratization to avoid the risk of social or economic destabilization. Human development is correlated with a society's capacity and desire for democracy. In turn, human development correlates with a military regime's willingness to relinquish power. Urbanization and industrialization support the creation of a middle class that is better equipped for civic engagement. Democratization in regions with lower human development often result in joint civilian-military governance.

The implementation of civilian government does not necessarily lead to democracy, as the military may continue to exert influence and rule in tandem with civilian leadership. Following democratization, a civilian government is immediately faced with the issue of military regulation and to establish civilian control of the military. Such policies must be implemented in a way that does not threaten the military or make the government appear unstable so as to avoid provoking further military intervention. The militarization of police can create long term stability issues after democratization, as military and civilian policing are not immediately compatible. The abolition of military police creates separate issues as it effectively creates mass unemployment of individuals trained in violence. Democracies borne from military dictatorships typically have higher homicide rates than those of other democracies.

== Structure ==
=== Government positions ===
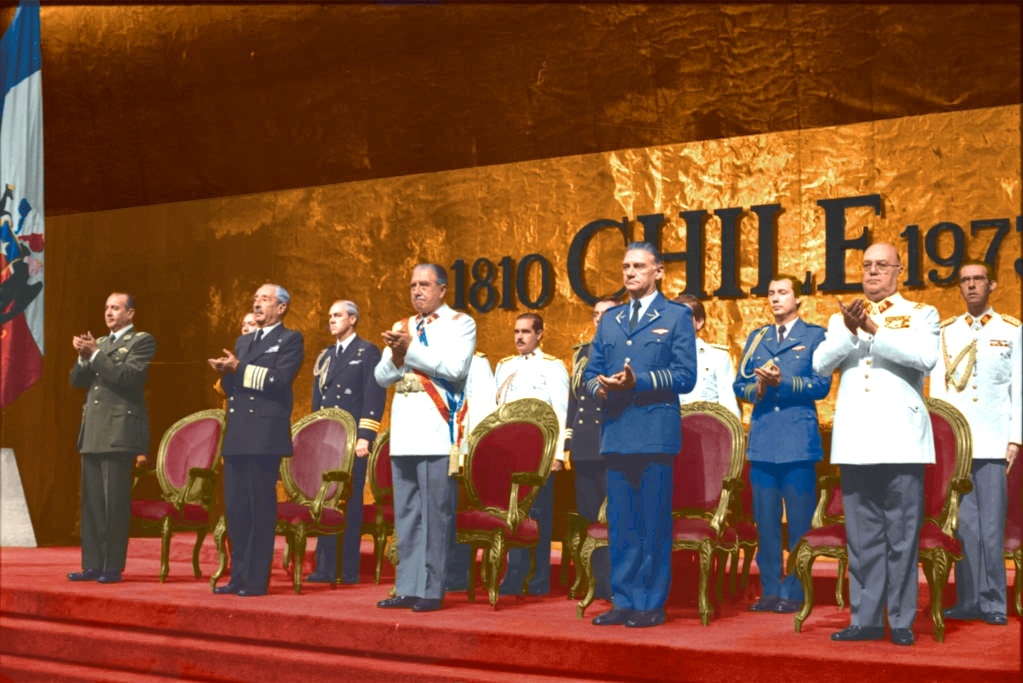
Chilean military dictator Augusto Pinochet and his Government Junta

The organization of power in a military dictatorship is heavily influenced by the chain of command used in militaries. In military dictatorships with a single ruler, the dictator is typically the highest ranking officer among those involved in a coup, and the hierarchical structure of a military lends itself to efficient control in a dictatorship led by military officers. The military dictator often holds strong control over the regional leaders that they appoint, as they are subject to the dictator's orders under the chain of command. Junior officers sometimes take power through a military coup, particularly when factionalism has broken down the traditional command structure, and most coups led by junior officers defer to senior officers after seizing power.

The inner circle that carries out the dictator's orders in a military dictatorship is made up of other military officers. These officers are responsible for representing the forces under their command in the government and maintaining their loyalty to the regime. Military dictators are often limited in choosing their inner circle, as they are expected to comply with standard procedure for military promotion. As these officers have control over large numbers of soldiers and weapons, dictators have strong incentive to appease them, and they can serve as a constraining force on the dictator. In some cases, military officers may be pressured to retire from the military upon taking power as a check on their ability to control military promotions and postings while ruling as dictator. Because of the political influence of soldiers and officers, policy in a military dictatorship heavily favors the military, often through increased military spending and other benefits for enlisted members.

Civilians are subject to the decisions of military leadership, typically without any role in decision making, and force is used to ensure compliance. Civilian presence in the government is sometimes used to create legitimacy, but this varies between regimes. The military may rule through a civilian government, or there may be no civilian presence in the government at all. Military dictators may also attempt to shift power toward a civilian or party-controlled government over which they have more personal control. A stable civilian bureaucracy is necessary for long term success of a military dictatorship, as military officers often lack the political skills necessary to maintain a government. Civilians with expertise in a given area might be tasked with making political decisions, but this power can be revoked at any time by the military leadership. Some military dictatorships appoint representatives that nominally serve as the civilian voice in government, but these individuals are selected by the military without any input from the people.

=== Classification ===
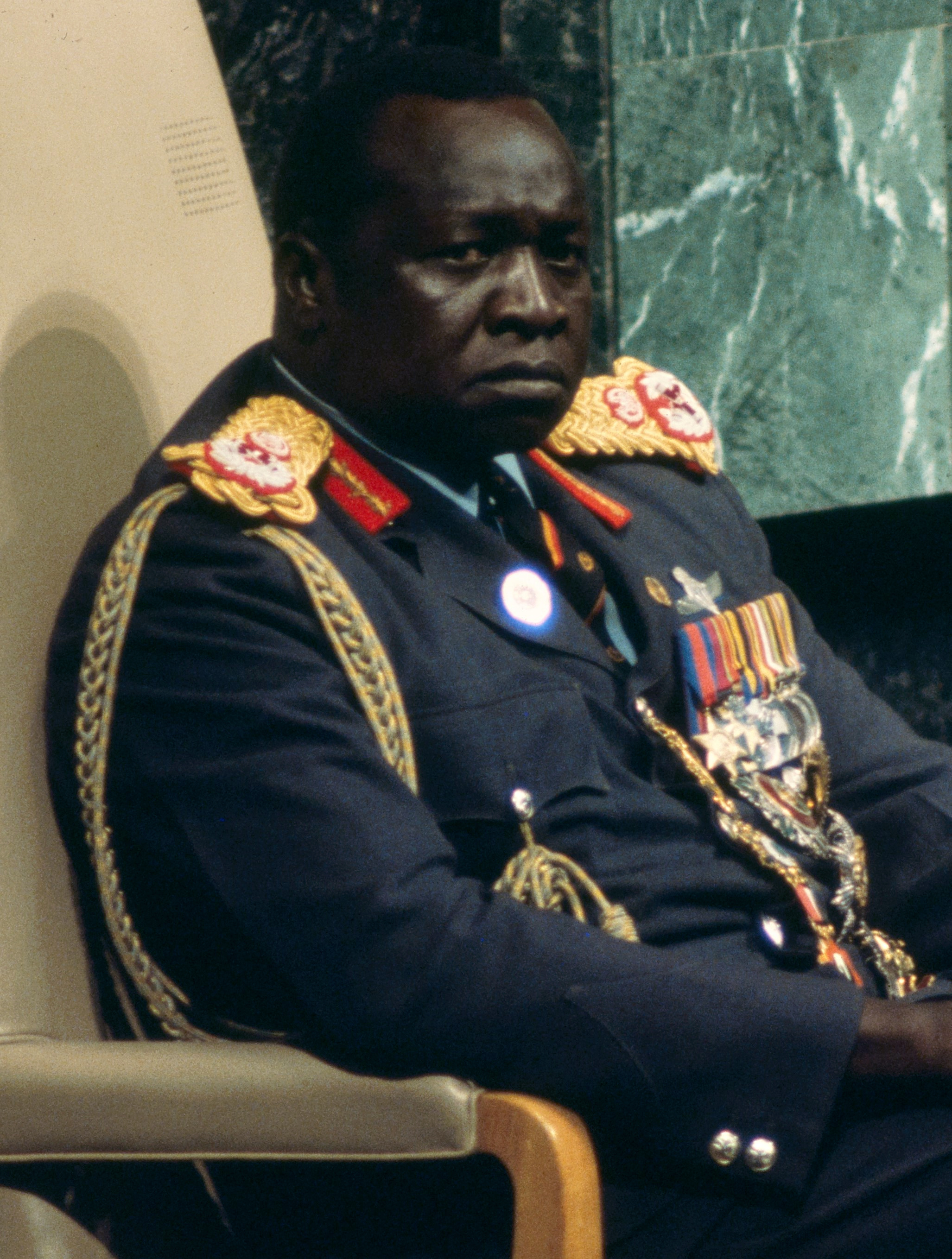
Idi Amin seized power as a military strongman in Uganda by having rival military officers killed.

Different definitions and criteria may be used to determine whether a government can be described as a military dictatorship. Some scholars may classify any authoritarian regime led by a military officer as a military dictatorship. Stricter definitions may require certain standards of the military as a professionalized institution or that the dictator is accountable to the military. Some dictatorships may blend elements of different classifications, allowing for military dictatorships to also be personalist or one-party dictatorships. Subtypes of military dictatorship include military juntas, in which power is shared by several military officers at the highest level, and military strongmen, in which power is held by a single military dictator without meaningful influence from the military as an institution.

A military junta is a type of leadership structure in a military dictatorship in which a committee of military officers rules in unison. The junta typically includes the leader of each branch of the military and sometimes the state police. Many juntas present themselves as restorers of peace, adopting titles such as "Committee of National Restoration", or "National Liberation Committee". Juntas frequently appoint one member as the head, effectively making that person the dictator. Officers working alongside this dictator wield considerable political power, and the dictator will often be subject to removal by fellow junta members. The military structure provides stability for such a government, as officers have effective control over their subordinates and can bargain on their behalf. Factionalism can threaten the junta structure, as it incentivizes lower-ranked officers to change their loyalties. As power is not consolidated under a single person, military juntas are subject to political backlash and have to consider the political preferences of their constituents. Unlike democracies, the constituents under a military junta are the junior officers rather than the citizenry.

Strongmen are dictators that rule as both military dictators and personalist dictators. They seize power and rule through the military, but they do not meaningfully share their power with other officers, instead ruling unilaterally. These dictatorships become increasingly personalist as the ruler consolidates power and subjugates rivals, eventually culminating in cults of personality. Other military officers may hold positions in the government, but they have no power to restrain the dictator or influence policy decisions. A military dictator becomes a strongman by securing control of state security forces, allowing the dictator to coerce other officers. Military dictators that seek to personalize their rule must bypass the higher-ranked officers that make up the inner circle, negotiating with the lower-ranked officers directly. Achieving direct control over the military also allows the dictator to appoint loyalists to important positions while excluding competitors. Military officers might demand that the dictator give up their military rank upon taking power for this reason.

== Politics ==
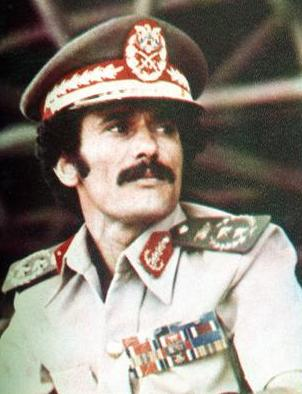
Ali Abdullah Saleh, the president and a military dictator of the Yemen Arab Republic and later Republic of Yemen

Military dictatorships vary greatly in how they function, what ideologies they proclaim, and what policies they enforce. The level of direct military involvement in governance depends on how the military institution is structured. In some cases, the military may be unable to have its interests heard, depending on how integrated the military is with state actors and whether power is divided among military officers. Similar to absolute monarchies, military dictatorships traditionally adhere to a classical conception of authoritarianism that rejects partisan politics and allows other institutions, such as churches, to exist and hold power. This is contrasted with totalitarianism, which engages in control of all ideological and social elements within the dictatorship. Military dictatorships have a comparatively low tolerance for political activity of any sort, and they rarely construct any form of political apparatus or party system to organize the government. Instead, military regimes will maintain power through political repression. Outside of the political sphere, the regime often does not significantly affect the day-to-day life of citizens.

Military dictatorships rarely see economic prosperity. Poor economic performance is dangerous to a military regime, as it affects the regime's legitimacy and may even encourage the military to give up power. On rare occasions when they do see economic success, it can result in the creation of a middle class. This shifts the political dynamic of the regime as the middle class demands more involvement in government. Military dictatorship is distinct from oligarchy, and regimes do not necessarily serve the interests of the upper class as other forms of dictatorship often do. The economic policies of military regimes can diverge significantly, including both pro-capitalist and anti-capitalist regimes. The military generally has the power to redistribute wealth as it sees fit. Accordingly, the military will receive more funding while it is in power. Military regimes are better equipped for budget-maximization than other regimes, as the military is a close group and does not have to share wealth with an expanding bureaucracy. The extent that military riches will increase depends on whether officers prioritize self-enrichment or preserving political power. While in power, the military must ensure its members receive enough spoils to keep them satisfied without giving so much that it destabilizes the government.

Many dictators have chosen to emphasize their strength by incorporating military tradition into their personal styles. This may include adopting military ranks in their formal titles and wearing military uniforms. While common among military dictators, these strategies have also been used by civilian dictators. Other military dictators have avoided demonstrating their allegiance to the military by dressing in civilian clothes and removing their military ranks so as to invoke the legitimacy of a civilian government. Militarism among dictators has become less common in the 21st century as dictators have emphasized public approval over ruling through fear.

=== Policy development and implementation ===
Military dictatorships may rule directly, implementing a specific ideology and vision, or they may rule as arbitrators that see themselves as protectors of the nation and the government. These arbitrator dictatorships tend only to last until civilian government can be restored, while direct rulers seek to consolidate their own power and reject civilian rule as inferior. Policies of a military dictatorship are made through decree from military leadership and enforced by the military in its entirety, sometimes without warning or advance notice. As members of the military are typically concerned with the preservation of the military, internal divisions are often seen as a greater threat than external forces.

Policy goals in a military dictatorship are rarely organized, preventing a regime from implementing policies and programs with a clear objective. Policy preferences of military dictatorships primarily diverge from other forms of dictatorship in their approach to war and political opposition. Military regimes are generally independent from special interests and have no allegiance to any particular social class, as the military is its own institution with competing interests among its members. Military dictators have no unifying ideology, and they may enforce left-wing politics or right-wing politics. Though approximately half of dictatorships hold unfair elections to consolidate power, military dictatorships are less likely to do so, with less than one quarter of military dictatorships holding elections.

Military training emphasizes unity and cohesiveness, and these ideas are reinforced by coordinated action through training and military operations. Factionalism is subject to increase when militaries are not actively engaged in these behaviors and do not have a clear objective. Factions that form among elites within military dictatorships are less likely to have an ideological basis, as military officers are more likely to be aligned in policy preferences and to prioritize military unity, allowing for more efficient implementation of policy. Factionalism affects most military dictatorships, particularly if the regime fails to perform adequately in the eyes of its elites.

=== Use of force ===
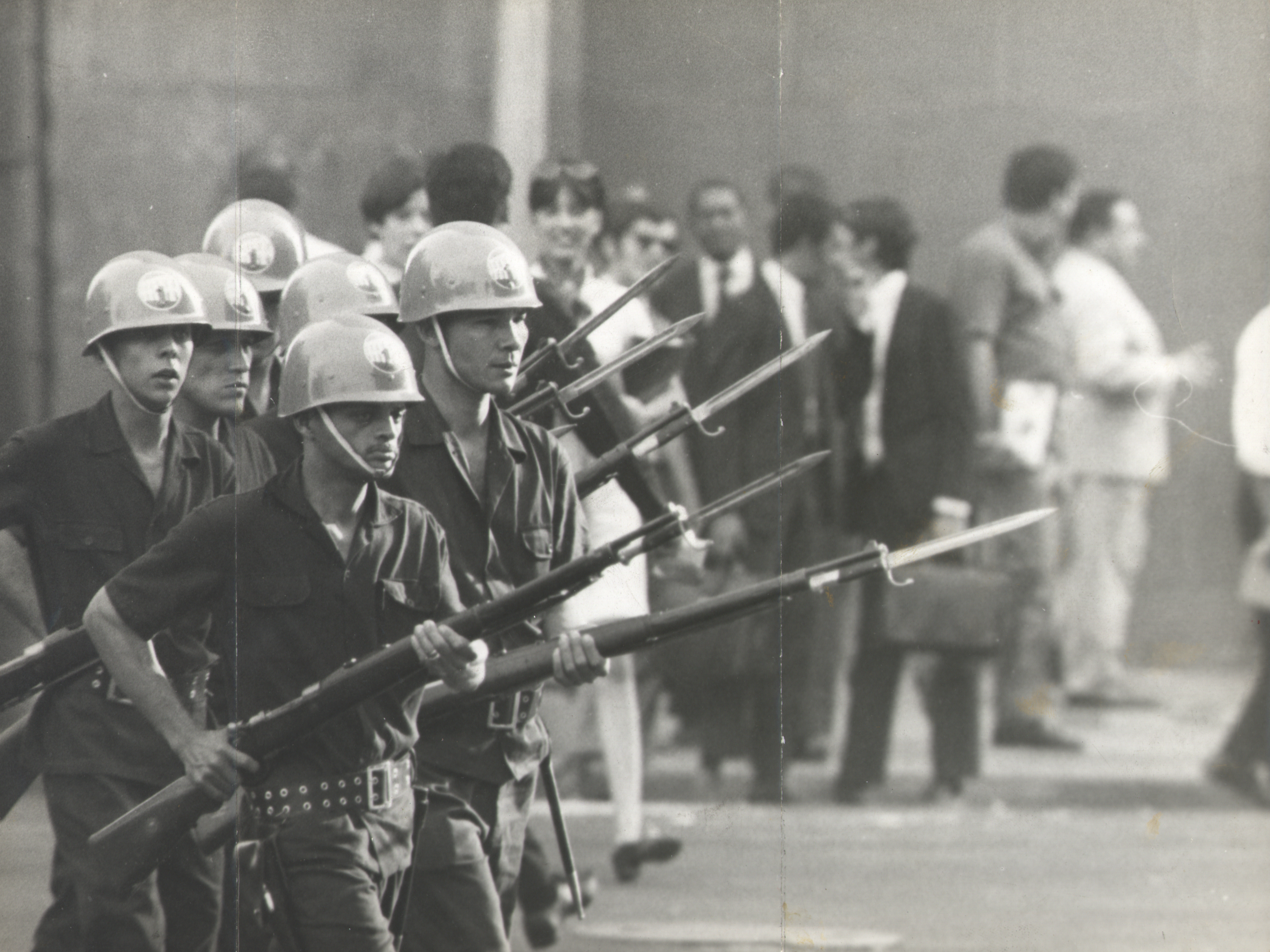
Military forces during the military dictatorship in Brazil

Relative to other dictatorships, military regimes rely disproportionately on force in international relations. The individuals running a military dictatorship are more experienced in military means than political or diplomatic means, and a lifelong career in the military leads to a military mindset among its leadership. Military officers are more inclined to view foreign relations as confrontational rather than diplomatic for the same reason. Military activity is seen as routine, and military dictators are less likely to ascribe high cost to the use of military force. This is particularly true of military juntas, where the military mindset of junior officers compounds this effect by applying increased political pressure. Conversely, diplomacy is seen as higher cost as it may strengthen civilian control of the military. Military dictators are also more skeptical of the idea that diplomacy can maintain peace and security, and they often see foreign nations as threats, even if they are nominally allies. The limited capacity for diplomacy means that a military dictatorship might engage in a preemptive war if conflict seems likely. Threats issued by military dictatorships are generally seen as more credible than those of other regimes, and they are less likely to escalate into conflict.

Military dictatorships may be challenged by inefficient police forces, as the military structure must be repurposed for internal suppression and soldiers are often unwilling to fight unarmed civilians. Officers may also be reluctant to engage in domestic operations. Paramilitary forces and civilian police forces are created under military dictatorships to supplement the military for these reasons. Human rights violations and state-sanctioned atrocities in military dictatorships are often carried out by these non-military security forces rather than by the military itself. Military dictatorships have been found to engage in torture more frequently than other regimes.

Despite the heavy influence of military tradition, military dictatorships are not necessarily more militaristic or more prone to external conflict. The use of military force internally restricts the ability to project it externally, and vice versa. As military dictatorships depend on internal use of the military, they are less capable of maintaining combat readiness for conflicts with other countries. The use of the military as an oppressive force reduces civilian support for militarism, resulting in fewer willing enlistments and less war effort collaboration between civilians and the military during times of conflict. The politicization of the military introduces further weakness into the military as a means of projecting power, as political conflict between officers comes at the expense of the soldiers under their command. At the same time, these factors increase the risk of civil conflict relative to other forms of government.

== History ==
=== Early military dictatorships ===
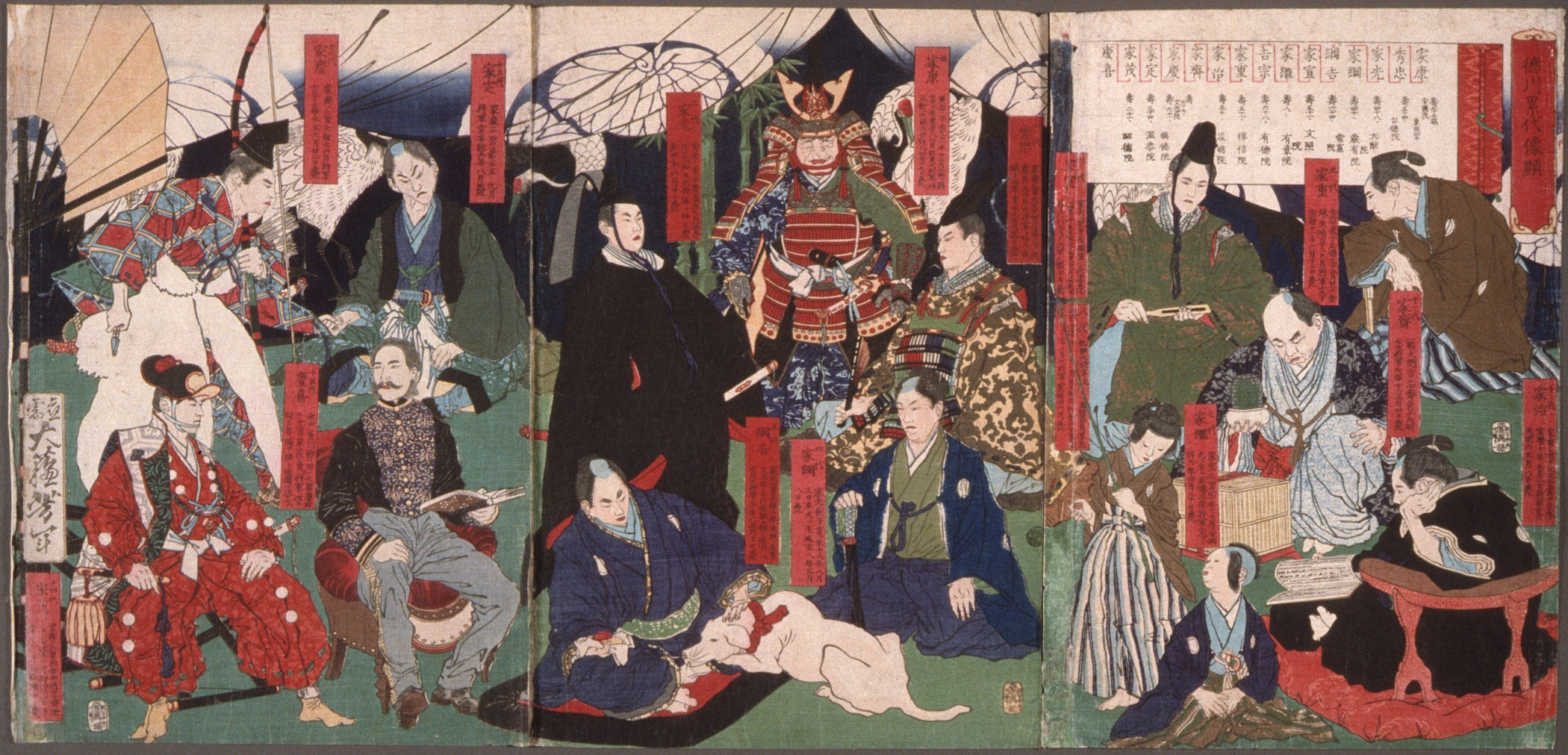
A woodblock print of the rulers of the Tokugawa shogunate (Tsukioka Yoshitoshi, 19th century)

The rule of warlords that seized power over the central government in ancient China have been compared to modern military dictatorships. These include Dong Zhuo in the 2nd century and Cao Cao in the 3rd century. Korea underwent military rule in the post-classical era. The Goguryeo kingdom fell under the control of military leader Yŏn Kaesomun in 642. Yeon took absolute power after having the monarch killed and having another member of the royal family placed on the throne as a figurehead. Another military autocracy developed in Korea in 1170 when the military officers of the Goryeo dynasty revolted against the expansion of civil service at the expense of the military. The monarch was again replaced with a relative to serve as a figurehead, and a series of military officers ruled over the Goryeo military regime as they sought to undermine and seize power from one another. Power was consolidated by Ch'oe Ch'ung-hŏn through a coup in 1196, and his descendants ruled until 1258.

Japan was ruled by a series of military rulers called shoguns, beginning with the formation of the Kamakura shogunate in 1185. While shoguns nominally operated under the Emperor of Japan, they served as de facto rulers of Japan and the Japanese military. Japan was ruled by shoguns until the Meiji Restoration that brought about the fall of the Tokugawa shogunate in 1868. During the Lê dynasty of Vietnam between the 16th and 18th centuries, the country was under de facto military rule by two rival military families, the Trịnh lords in the north and the Nguyễn lords in the south, in a form of government that resembled military dictatorship.

The Commonwealth of England under Oliver Cromwell has been described as a military dictatorship by its contemporary opponents and by some modern academics. This government was formed by Cromwell while he was a general in 1649, and his rule was effectively maintained by the military until the Humble Petition and Advice recognized him as a constitutional ruler in 1657. The direct influence held by the military varied throughout Cromwell's rule.

=== 19th century and World Wars ===
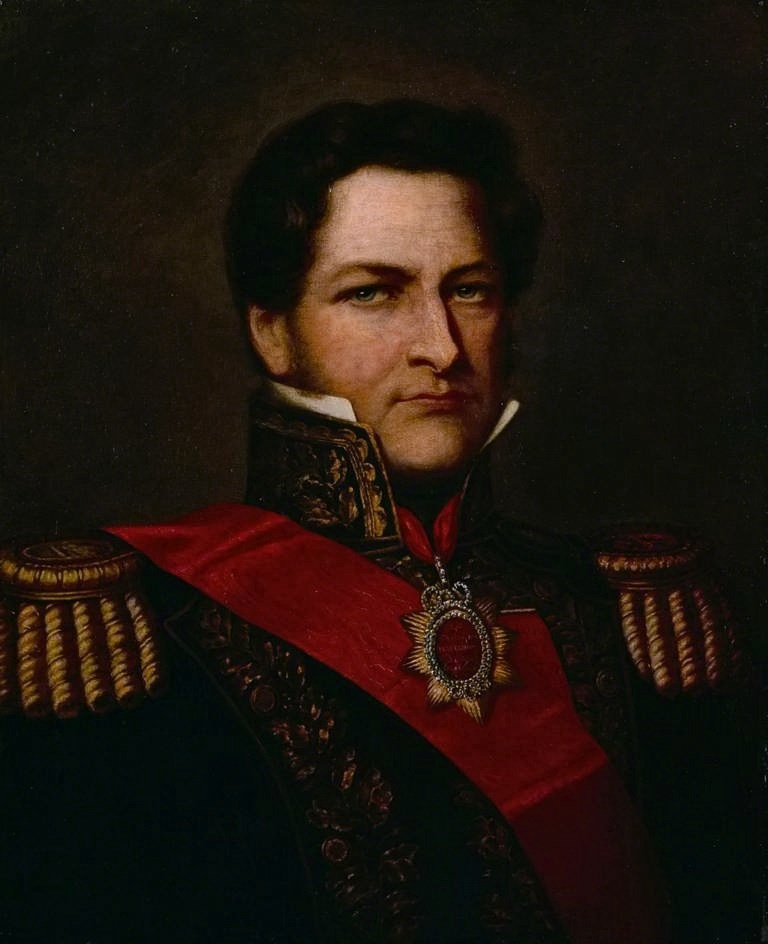
A depiction of Argentine military dictator Juan Manuel de Rosas (Helen Bramwell Norris, c. 1890)

Latin America was the only region of the world where military dictatorships were common in the 19th century. The Spanish American wars of independence took place in the early-19th century, creating new Latin American governments. Many of these governments fell under the control of caudillos, or personalist dictators. Most caudillos came from a military background, and their rule was typically associated with pageantry and glamor. Most caudillos were nominally constrained by a constitution but had the power to draft a new constitution as they wished. Dictatorships in Latin America persisted into the 20th century, and further military coups established new regimes, often in the name of nationalism. By the 1930s, several Latin American militaries had modernized and integrated themselves into civil society.

Several military dictatorships developed in Eastern Europe after World War I. The rule of Józef Piłsudski in Poland developed in the style of a Latin American dictatorship with a violent military coup, but it became significantly more militant than other military dictatorships due to the perceived threat from the surrounding great powers. Romania became a military dictatorship when power was willingly transferred to the military by Carol II of Romania, establishing Ion Antonescu as a dictator styled as a "Conducător". Spain became a military dictatorship in 1923. Portugal became a military dictatorship in 1926, lasting until it was replaced by the personalist rule of Antonio Salazar in 1932.

Japan gradually moved toward military rule in the 1930s and 1940s, taking the form of a junta as military officers gained influence amid rising militarism. This period in Japanese history saw power struggles between civilian and military officials, culminating in the appointment of General Hideki Tojo as prime minister in 1941.

=== Postwar military dictatorships ===
Widespread attention to military dictatorship as a form of government developed in the 1960s as militaries seized power in several countries, particularly in South America. Early study focused extensively on what caused military dictatorships. The Cold War caused a surge in military dictatorships, as both the Western Bloc and the Eastern Bloc tolerated military regimes that promised stability, and both supported regime change against those that did not.

A global reversal of military dictatorships began in the 1970s and 1980s when militaries increasingly gave up power in favor of civilian rule. The system of tolerating military dictatorship ended following the fall of the Eastern Bloc at the end of the Cold War, and the Western Bloc had wider latitude to challenge authoritarianism in military regimes. Since then, the global community has taken a stronger stance against military dictatorships and other forms of undemocratic government. Military coups are virtually nonexistent outside of Africa in the 21st century, with Myanmar being the only exception between 2017 and 2022.

==== Africa ====
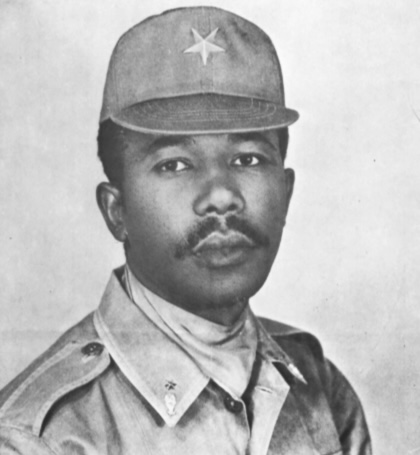
Photograph of Ethiopian military dictator Mengistu Haile Mariam. Mengistu ruled Ethiopia from 1977 to 1991 and carried out extremely brutal repressions of dissent, such as so-called Qey Shibir.

Military dictatorships were one of the two regime types that became common in Africa after decolonization in the 1960s through the 1980s, alongside one-party states. At the time of decolonization, no meaningful institutions or national identity existed to maintain democracy or economic growth. Due to the colonial history of African nations and the higher frequency of civil conflict rather than external conflict, militaries in sub-Saharan Africa struggled to develop as institutions, allowing military strongmen to consolidate power more easily. Military oppression had been a common occurrence under colonial rule, and military institutions in Africa were already predisposed to internal control. Several African military dictators, such as Hamani Diori of Niger, Jean-Bédel Bokassa of the Central African Republic, and Idi Amin of Uganda, were at one point involved with colonial militaries. Ethnic conflict has also prompted military officers to carry out regime change, particularly among post-colonial nations where the military and the civilian government had different ethnic makeups.

Between 1959 and 2001, 14 African countries experienced at least three successful military coups. Nigeria was particularly affected, with six military dictators between two separate regimes. The military dictatorship in Nigeria was one of the most prominent in Africa, forming shortly after independence and persisting for most of the century thereafter. By 1975, half of African countries were subject to military rule. Many African militaries traditionally saw themselves as guardians that oversaw the nation, intervening when civilian government exerted authority over the military. Other military dictatorships in Africa sought power simply to provide advantages for its members and its political interests. African military dictators often seized power citing a failure of civilian government, banning all political activity and suspending the constitution. In many cases, former military dictators in Africa later sought election as civilian rulers. Several African military dictators nominally adopted socialist messaging to gain support from neighboring one-party socialist dictatorships.

Public rejection of military dictatorship in Africa significantly increased in the 1980s as pro-democracy protests took place across the continent. Democratization of military dictatorships became more common by 1995, when approximately half of the countries in Africa were democracies. Several of the surviving military dictatorships in Africa also enacted measures to increase citizen participation in local governance. Instances of military dictatorships challenging democracy continued, however, with several military governments cancelling elections and overthrowing democratic governments in the 1990s. As of 2023, Africa is the only continent that sees regular military coups.

==== Arab world ====
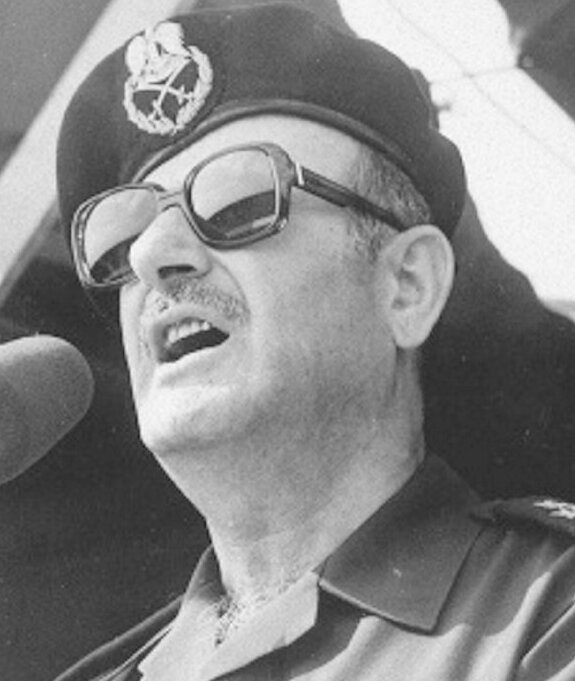
Syrian general Hafez al-Assad seized power in Syria after purging rival officers during a military coup in 1970.

In the Arab world, several countries, including Iraq, Syria, and Yemen, experienced numerous military coups during 1950s and 1960s. In Syria, the 1963 coup by the Ba'athist military committee was followed by a series of coups and counter-coup attempts by rival Ba'athist factions. The intra-Ba'athist power struggle persisted until the 1970 coup, when General Hafez al-Assad gained undisputed control of the Syrian military and the Arab Socialist Ba'ath party. Subsequently, he consolidated power by constructing a surveillance state characterized by intense militarism. A similar military dictatorship was also established in Libya under Muammar Gaddafi's rule during the 1970s.

Military coups have since been infrequent in the Arab world with the exception of Iraq. Following the 1990 Yemeni unification, the Yemen again divided between supporters of military rule and a one-party secessionist state until the military-ruled Yemen Arab Republic seized control of the entire nation in the Yemeni Civil War of 1994. Military coups have since been infrequent in the Middle East with the exceptions of Iraq and Turkey.

In the 21st century, Egypt was placed under temporary military dictatorship following the 2011 Egyptian revolution and again after the 2013 Egyptian coup d'état. Sudan shifted from a personalist dictatorship to a military dictatorship following the 2019 Sudanese coup d'état.

==== East and Southeast Asia ====
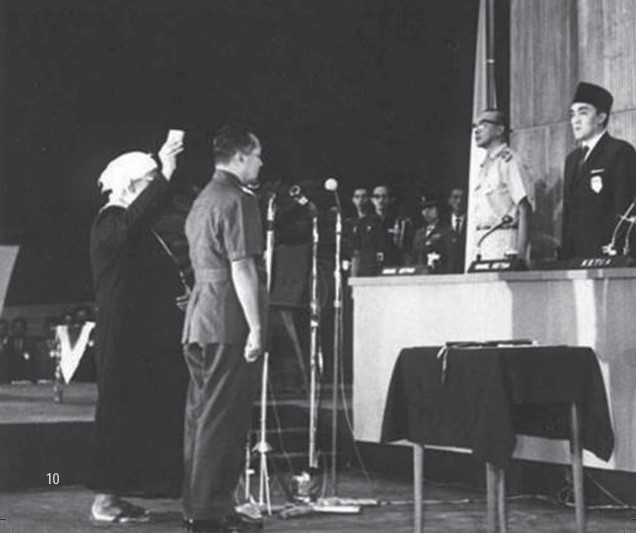
The 1967 inauguration of Suharto as President of Indonesia, marking the start of his 31-year military-backed dictatorship, which was notorious for authoritarian rule, widespread corruption, and human rights abuses

South Korea became a military dictatorship after the May 16 coup in 1961, following years of military buildup and political involvement. The military organized the Democratic Republican Party to hold political power after nominally returning to civilian government in 1963. A series of military dictators ruled until democratization in 1987, though the military remained influential in politics thereafter.

Indonesia underwent a long military dictatorship under the New Order of Suharto from 1966 to 1998. This dictatorship introduced some liberal reforms and saw relative stability until unrest caused by the 1997 Asian financial crisis.

Myanmar has become an exception among military dictatorships for its long military rule, and it has been recognized as "the most durable military regime worldwide". The military first seized power from 1958 to 1960 and again from 1962 to 2011, then maintaining indirect rule before seizing control a third time in 2021. Neighboring Thailand has seen a similar trend, where the military has ruled directly or indirectly for most years since 1932, with only four civilian governments being formed between 1932 and 2011.

==== Europe ====
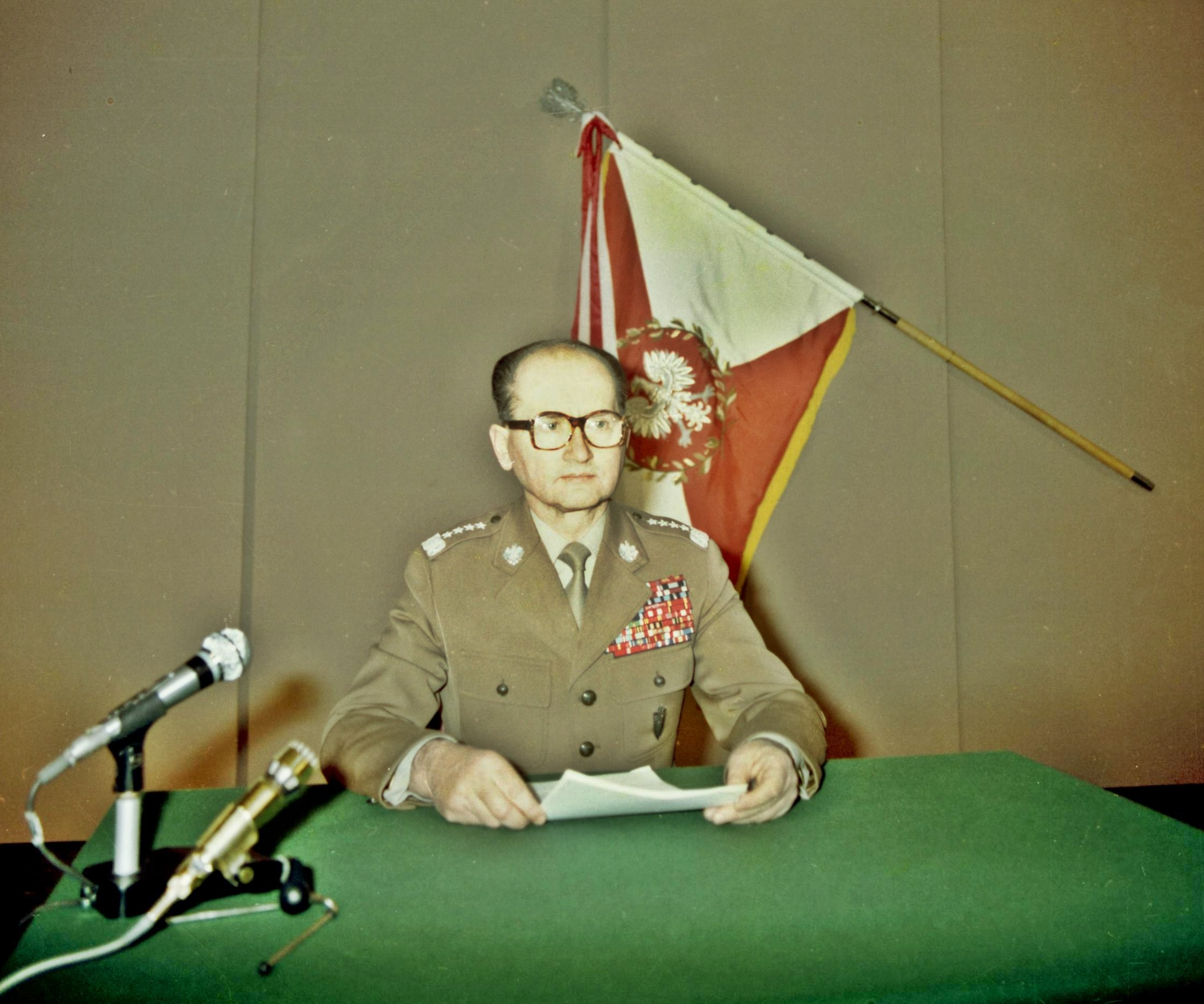
Polish military dictator Wojciech Jaruzelski declaring a martial law on 13 December 1981

In 1967, the military of Greece seized power with the stated intention of ending corruption and demagoguery. The Greek junta ruled until 1974, at which point a political crisis prompted by the Cyprus problem convinced the military to return power to the previous civilian government. In 1981, General Wojciech Jaruzelski of Poland became first secretary of the Polish United Workers' Party, the ruling party of Poland's one-party dictatorship. Two months later, he proclaimed martial law, putting the country under military rule and replacing a one-party dictatorship with a military dictatorship. Martial law ended in 1983, but Jaruzelski retained political power.

==== Latin America ====
Military dictatorship surged in Latin America during the 1960s, with unstable economic conditions allowing military juntas to take power. Between 1967 and 1991, 12 Latin American countries underwent at least one military coup, with Haiti and Honduras experiencing three and Bolivia experiencing eight. A large wave of military dictatorships occurred in the 1970s, and most of Latin America was under the rule of military dictatorships by the middle of the decade. Foreign aid to support Latin American militaries was one factor that allowed further military coups, and the political polarization of the Cold War played a role in creating the political instability that incentivized military rule.

Argentina was particularly susceptible to military dictatorship during the Cold War, with ten separate military dictators ruling across four different regimes between 1943 and 1983. Brazil and Guatemala also saw five and six separate military dictators, respectively. The military dictatorship in Brazil was unique both in that it lasted nearly 20 years and that it allowed elections with competing political parties. El Salvador became a dictatorship in 1931, becoming a rare example of a partisan military dictatorship. The country was ruled by the military-run National Pro Patria Party from 1933 to 1944, the Revolutionary Party of Democratic Unification from 1950 to 1960, and the National Conciliation Party from 1962 to 1979.

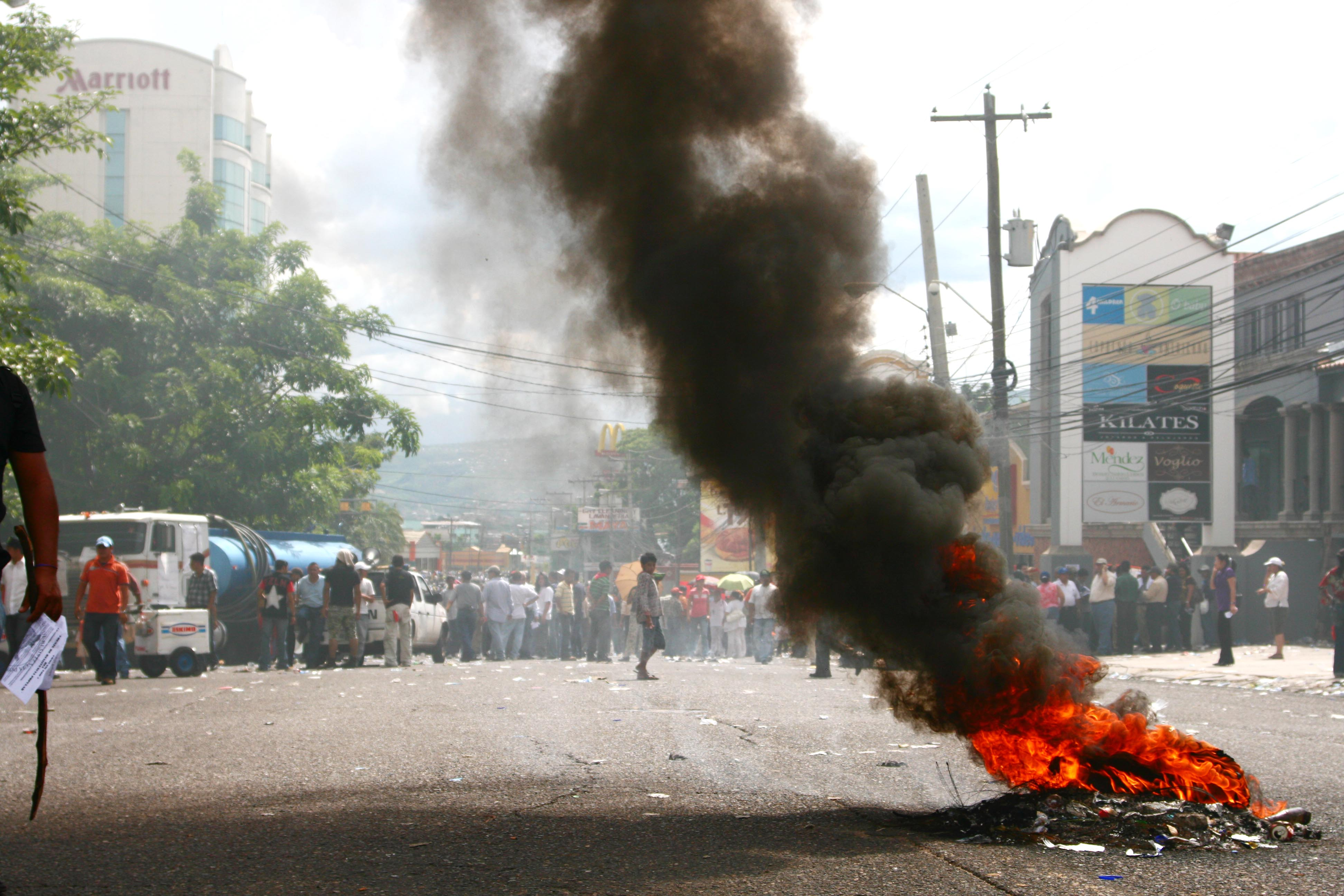
Military dictatorship had virtually disappeared from Latin America prior to the 2009 Honduran coup d'état.

Reactionary military dictatorships were common in Latin America during the Cold War. These were regimes in which dictators maintained support among the middle class and upper class by implementing economic reforms and strengthening the dictatorship's stance in international economics. This included nations such as Chile under Augusto Pinochet. 17 of 20 countries in Latin America experienced reactionary military dictatorship at some point between World War II and the end of the Cold War. Some reformist military dictatorships also existed at this time, maintaining popular support by appealing to labor groups and the working class.

Foreign pressure, particularly from the Carter administration in the United States, prompted the end of several military dictatorships in the region in the late 1970s. Several Latin American countries began to democratize by the early-1980s, and the number of coups declined as well. Military dictatorship had virtually disappeared in Latin America by the end of the Cold War. The Argentine Carapintadas were unable to seize power in 1990 because there was strong public opposition to military rule. By the time of the 2009 Honduran coup, such events were considered unusual in the region.

== See also ==
- Films depicting Latin American military dictatorships
- Military democracy
- Military rule (disambiguation)
- Stratocracy
- Warlord
