= Military administration (disambiguation) =

Military administration refers to the internal government of armed forces. The term may also refer to:

- Military Administration (Nazi Germany), regions under German occupation in which the military exercised governmental powers
- Soviet Military Administration in Germany, the immediate post-World War II administration of East Germany

== See also ==
- British Military Administration (disambiguation)
- Military rule (disambiguation)
