= Military rule =

Military rule may mean:

- Military justice, the legal system applying to members of the armed forces
- Martial law, where military authority takes over normal administration of law
- Military occupation, when a country or area is occupied after invasion.
  - List of military occupations
- Military dictatorship, a form of government where political power resides with the military
- Military junta ("junta," from Spanish meaning "together")
- Military democracy, a form of military government of a war-based society which practices democracy, with an elected and removable supreme chief, a council of elders, and a popular assembly.
- Stratocracy, a form of government headed by military chiefs. The branches of government are administered by military forces, the government is legal under the laws of the jurisdiction at issue, and is usually carried out by military workers.

== See also ==
- Military administration (disambiguation)
