= Planar Crown connector =

Planar Crown is a series of Blind mate electrical RF connectors manufactured by API Weinchel. It is fitted for example to the RF input connector of the Tektronix Real Time Spectrum Analyzer RTSA-5000 series. An adapter is required to connect the more common N-type or 3.5 mm connectors. Another application example is the 26.5 GHz Channel 2 input on the Agilent/Keysight model 53152A Microwave Frequency counter.
