= BMAS =

BMAS may stand for:

- Bank Maspion, Indonesian banking and financial services public company
- British Medical Acupuncture Society
- British Military Administration (Somaliland)
- Bundesministerium für Arbeit und Soziales, German Federal Ministry of Labour and Social Affairs

== See also ==
- BMA (disambiguation)
