= Blind mate connector =

Electrical connector type

A blind mate connector is a type of electrical connector that has a mating action that happens when sliding or snapping the plugs, without requiring wrenches or other tools. They have self-aligning features which allows a small misalignment when mating.

== Usage ==
Electrical blind mate connectors provide power or signal and are distinguished from other connectors in that they do not feature a rigid mechanical retention mechanism belonging to the interface itself, such as a threaded coupling nut on an SMA connector. They are typically used in a multi-pin arrangement between racks and panels, daughtercard to backplane, or similar applications where the connector is not mated by itself, but rather by the action of inserting the entire unit or module.

== Types ==
=== RF ===
Blind mate RF connectors are generally intended to be used without wrenches or other tools, but can come packaged in a multiport configuration that includes mounting hardware or provided as inserts in a circular connector such as a MIL-DTL-38999. Some examples of blind mate RF interfaces include BMA (OSP), BMMA (OSSP), SMP, SMPM, SMPS, and Planar Crown connectors.

Certain styles of blind mate RF connectors feature a detent or undercut to allow for the mating connector to snap into, improving retention. These styles are typically used when the mate is a cable connector and might see a significant force that would normally demate the connection. Other configurations feature a smooth bore into which the mate simply slides to connect. These arrangements are more commonly found in board to board connections, where they are mated with a female to female "bullet" adapter, and no significant force is present to demate the connection.

=== Optical ===
Optical signals can also be connected using blind mate connectors providing the capability to link fibre optics on a plug-in card to an optical backplane, or through an optical midplane.
