= Battery Manufacturing Association =

Battery Manufacturing Association (BMA) was a British company located in Hove. In 1952 the company entered the microcar arena with the B.M.A. Hazelcar. It was styled as a roadster with aluminium bodywork. It was powered by a 1.5 hp electric engine fed by nine six-volt batteries giving it a top speed of 20 mph (32 km/h) and a range of up to 60 miles (97 km). The price of £535 meant that few were sold. Production ended in 1954. They made approx 25 vehicles which included some electric vans.

== Hazelcar ==
In 1949 two brothers, Eric and Roy Hazeldine, had set up a garage business in Telscombe Cliffs and Rottingdean Sussex, where they designed and built the little Hazelcar. The initial idea was to design a car that would do 50 mph (80 km/h) and 50 miles to the gallon (5.6 L/100 km). With its transverse four cylinder engine with an end on gearbox (although mounted in the rear) and little wheels, it was the forerunner of the Mini. A petrol version of this type is currently on show in the Bentley Motor Museum in Sussex. They then joined forces with BMA.
