= Broaden Media Academy =

Broaden Media Academy was a film and video post-production training facility in Taipei, Taiwan. The faculty included award-winning professionals and Apple-certified trainers offering courses on standard software packages such as Avid, Final Cut Pro, Apple Motion, DVD Studio Pro, Pro Tools and Shake.
