= Bahamas Maritime Authority =

Ship registration authority for the Bahamas

The Bahamas Maritime Authority (BMA) is an authority that registers vessels in the Bahamas and enforces safety standards on Bahamian-registered craft. The authority has an office in the Shirlaw House in Nassau. It also has offices in the Bahamas House in New York City, in the Hutchinson House in Hong Kong, and in London.

The agency was established in July 1995. Prior to the establishment of the authority, the Bahamas Ministry of Transport maintained the register of ships that were Bahamian-flagged. The BMA was formed due to growth that made the prior arrangement difficult.

The agency also does marine accident investigations involving Bahamian-flagged vessels.
