= Military democracy =

War-based society that practices democracy

A military democracy is a war-based society that practices democracy. The category is often applied to historical peoples. An example is Frederick Engels' characterization:

"The military commander, the council, and the popular assembly formed the organs of military democracy, military because war and the organization of war were now the regular functions of life of the people. The wealth of their neighbors excited the greed of the peoples, who began to regard acquisition of wealth as one of the main purposes in life. They were barbarians: plunder appeared to them easier and even more honorable than productive work. War, once waged simply to avenge aggression or as a means of enlarging territory that had become inadequate, was now waged for the sake of plunder alone, and became a regular profession. . . . The growth of slavery had already begun to brand working for a living as slavish and more ignominious than engaging in plunder."

According to Engels, the Greek Heroic Age was a typical example of military democracy. Lewis Henry Morgan spoke of two features: "the military state of society, and the system of administration consisting of an elective and removable supreme chief, a council of elders and a popular assembly."
