= British Military Administration =

British Military Administration (BMA) may refer to:

- The British Military Administration of Borneo, the interim administration of British Borneo between the end of World War II (September 1945) and the establishment of the Crown Colony in North Borneo and Sarawak in July 1946.
- The British Military Administration of Eritrea, the interim administration established in former Italian Eritrea between 1941 and 1952.
- The British Military Administration of Libya (sometimes known as British Military Administration (Tripolitania)), the interim administration established on former Italian Libya between the beginning of Allied occupation of the territory in late 1942 and the independence of the Kingdom of Libya on 24 December 1951.
- The British Military Administration of Malaya, the interim administration of British Malaya between the end of World War II (September 1945) and the establishment of the Malayan Union in April 1946.
- The British Military Administration of Somaliland, the interim administration established in former Italian Somaliland and British Somaliland between 1941 and 1949.
- The British Military Administration of Vietnam and Indochina under Lord Louis Mountbatten from 13 September 1945 to 30 March 1946, codenamed Operation Masterdom, along with Nationalist Chinese and French forces.
- The British Military Administration of Hong Kong from 1 September 1945 to 1 May 1946 under Admiral Cecil Harcourt, after the surrender by the Japanese. (The military government of Hong Kong was not officially classified as a British Military Administration.)
